= List of listed buildings in Edinburgh/27 =

This is a list of listed buildings in Edinburgh, Scotland.

== List ==
Name	Location	Date Listed	Grid Ref. (Note: Sometimes known as OSGB36, the grid reference (where provided) is based on the British national grid reference system used by the Ordnance Survey. • "Guide to National Grid". Ordnance Survey. • "Get-a-map". Ordnance Survey.)	Geo-coordinates	Notes	LB Number (Note: Historic Environment Scotland assign a unique alphanumeric identifier to each designated site in Scotland, for listed buildings this always begins with "LB", for example "LB12345".)	Image
Glenbrook Road, Glenbrook House With Outbuildings Railings, Gates And Gatepiers				55°52′41″N 3°22′09″W	Category C(S)	26817	Upload Photo
27-31 (Odd Nos) Bernard Street And 1 Seaport Street With Gatepiers And Railings				55°58′32″N 3°10′05″W	Category A	26821	Upload Photo
Slateford Road Caledonian Brewery				55°56′08″N 3°13′53″W	Category B	26833	Upload another image
Colinton Road Napier University Merchiston Castle Gateway				55°55′59″N 3°12′48″W	Category B	26841	Upload Photo
104-108 Commercial Street, Macdonald House (Former Leith Nautical College) With Front Wall And Railings; Eh6 6Nn				55°58′40″N 3°10′36″W	Category B	26852	Upload Photo
Glenbrook Road, The Stables, (Former Stables To Glenpark House)				55°52′51″N 3°21′57″W	Category B	26857	Upload Photo
Robertson Avenue St Andrew's Works Front Block				55°56′06″N 3°14′05″W	Category C(S)	26755	Upload Photo
8 Bridge Road (Former Lodge To Larch Grove) With Boundary Walls, Railings And Gatepiers				55°53′09″N 3°20′25″W	Category B	26765	Upload Photo
Cluny Gardens And 5 Braid Road, Morningside Parish Church (Church Of Scotland) With Boundary Walls, Gatepiers, Lamp Posts And Railings				55°55′28″N 3°12′31″W	Category B	26770	Upload Photo
37 Bellfield Street				55°57′09″N 3°06′27″W	Category B	26776	Upload Photo
12 Claremont Park With Boundary Wall And Gatepiers				55°58′12″N 3°09′15″W	Category B	26791	Upload Photo
1 Cockburn Farm Cockburn House (Cockburn Farm Dairy) With Boundary Wall And Sundials				55°52′18″N 3°21′51″W	Category A	26792	Upload Photo
1 Abercorn Terrace, Including Boundary Walls And Gateway				55°57′03″N 3°06′29″W	Category C(S)	26711	Upload Photo
Ashley Terrace Craiglockhart Primary School With Caretaker's Lodge Playshed Gates Gatepiers And Railings				55°55′56″N 3°13′41″W	Category B	26717	Upload another image
4, 5 And 6 Greyfriars Place				55°56′48″N 3°11′29″W	Category B	18973	Upload Photo
Dalmeny Village, 6 Main Street				55°58′55″N 3°22′22″W	Category C(S)	5535	Upload Photo
Dalmeny Village, 11 Main Street				55°58′54″N 3°22′26″W	Category C(S)	5540	Upload Photo
Dalmeny Village, 14 And 15 Main Street				55°58′54″N 3°22′29″W	Category C(S)	5542	Upload Photo
Easter Dalmeny Tank				55°59′02″N 3°21′57″W	Category C(S)	5545	Upload Photo
Carlowrie, Carlowrie Farm Steading				55°57′55″N 3°21′51″W	Category C(S)	5555	Upload Photo
Carlowrie, Railway Bridge At Carlowrie Cottages				55°57′58″N 3°22′35″W	Category C(S)	5556	Upload Photo
6 Cramond Bridge, Cramond Brig Inn Former Coach-House, Including Wall				55°57′55″N 3°19′01″W	Category C(S)	5569	Upload Photo
Camus Park, Comiston House Dovecot				55°54′16″N 3°13′02″W	Category B	45836	Upload Photo
Camus Park, Gatepiers To W Of Comiston House Stables				55°54′16″N 3°13′05″W	Category C(S)	45837	Upload Photo
11 And 13 Valleyfield Street, The Carpet Mill (Former Agricultural Hall)				55°56′29″N 3°12′10″W	Category C(S)	45915	Upload Photo
3 Forth Street				55°57′27″N 3°11′17″W	Category B	45944	Upload Photo
Warriston Road And Logie Green Road, Waterston's Printing Works				55°57′58″N 3°11′49″W	Category C(S)	45962	Upload Photo
143 Grange Loan, Astley Ainslie Hospital, Garden Wall Incorporating Carved Panels To North Of Millbank Pavilion				55°55′49″N 3°12′02″W	Category C(S)	46194	Upload another image See more images
Nos 71-81 (Odd Nos) Morningside Road				55°55′50″N 3°12′35″W	Category B	46296	Upload Photo
62 East Trinity Road And 1 York Road, Corbiesteps, With Boundary Wall And Gatepiers				55°58′34″N 3°12′11″W	Category C(S)	46727	Upload Photo
64 East Trinity Road, Rose Cottage, With Boundary Wall And Gatepiers				55°58′34″N 3°12′12″W	Category C(S)	46728	Upload Photo
36-46 (Even Nos) East Fountainbrige Including Railings				55°56′43″N 3°12′16″W	Category B	47026	Upload another image
14-18 (Inclusive Nos) Leven Terrace, Including Railings				55°56′28″N 3°12′04″W	Category C(S)	47046	Upload Photo
Duddingston, The Causeway, Bella Vista, Garden Pavilion				55°56′33″N 3°08′59″W	Category C(S)	47154	Upload Photo
2 And 2A Ravelston Park, Including Boundary Walls				55°57′10″N 3°13′40″W	Category B	47264	Upload Photo
65 Dean Path, Dean Parish Church (Church Of Scotland) And Hall, With Boundary Walls, Gates And Railings				55°57′16″N 3°13′18″W	Category B	47354	Upload another image
3 And 4 Lockharton Gardens				55°55′34″N 3°13′59″W	Category B	47614	Upload Photo
17-19 (Odd Nos) Clermiston View, St Andrew's Church Including Bell-Tower				55°57′26″N 3°16′54″W	Category B	47716	Upload Photo
13-23 (Odd Nos) Shandwick Place				55°56′59″N 3°12′31″W	Category C(S)	47728	Upload Photo
29-37 (Odd Nos) Shandwick Place, The Maitland Hotel				55°56′58″N 3°12′33″W	Category C(S)	47729	Upload Photo
15A East Terrace, Ancillary Building				55°59′22″N 3°23′40″W	Category C(S)	47775	Upload Photo
30 And 31 High Street				55°59′24″N 3°23′44″W	Category B	47785	Upload Photo
4 Mid Terrace, Tyn Twill				55°59′23″N 3°23′44″W	Category C(S)	47788	Upload Photo
36 Castle Terrace				55°56′48″N 3°12′10″W	Category A	47857	Upload another image
14-20 (Even Nos) Cowgate (Former Cowgatehead Free Church)				55°56′53″N 3°11′37″W	Category B	47859	Upload another image
King's Stables Road, St Cuthbert's Church Halls, Including Boundary Walls, Railings, Gates, Gatepiers And Lamp Standards				55°56′57″N 3°12′18″W	Category C(S)	47883	Upload Photo
Lauriston Place, George Heriot's School Gatehouse, Terraces, War Memorial, Boundary Walls, Railings And Gates				55°56′43″N 3°11′37″W	Category B	47885	Upload another image
Lauriston Place, George Heriot's School, Preparatory Department				55°56′47″N 3°11′45″W	Category C(S)	47886	Upload Photo
30 And 32 Lauriston Place, Including Boundary Wall, Railings And Gate				55°56′43″N 3°11′48″W	Category B	47890	Upload Photo
34 And 36 Lauriston Place, Including Boundary Wall, Gate And Railings				55°56′43″N 3°11′48″W	Category B	47891	Upload another image
Edinburgh Castle, Vaults				55°56′54″N 3°12′01″W	Category A	48232	Upload Photo
4-8 (Even Nos) Forrest Road				55°56′46″N 3°11′27″W	Category C(S)	48240	Upload Photo
Mound Place, New College Quadrangle, Statue Of John Knox				55°56′59″N 3°11′42″W	Category C(S)	48246	Upload Photo
13-16 (Inclusive Nos) Ramsay Garden				55°56′57″N 3°11′48″W	Category A	48247	Upload another image See more images
11-14 (Inclusive Nos) Teviot Place				55°56′44″N 3°11′25″W	Category C(S)	48250	Upload Photo
West Princes Street Gardens, Royal Scots Memorial				55°57′04″N 3°11′50″W	Category B	48253	Upload another image See more images
562 Queensferry Road, Barnton Hotel				55°57′39″N 3°18′19″W	Category C(S)	48508	Upload Photo
33 Assembly Street				55°58′29″N 3°09′57″W	Category C(S)	48533	Upload Photo
1-7 (Inclusive Nos) Angle Park Terrace Including The Athletic Arms				55°56′20″N 3°13′26″W	Category C(S)	48568	Upload Photo
William Street Ne Lane (South Side)				55°56′59″N 3°12′45″W	Category C(S)	48874	Upload Photo
Douglas Crescent Gardens, Railings And Gates				55°56′58″N 3°13′18″W	Category B	48886	Upload Photo
7 Kinellan Road, Mcneil House, Including Boundary Walls				55°56′53″N 3°15′01″W	Category B	48890	Upload Photo
27 Murrayfield Avenue, Including Gatepiers And Boundary Walls				55°56′53″N 3°14′17″W	Category B	48896	Upload Photo
9 Osborne Terrace, Including Boundary Walls And Gatepier				55°56′44″N 3°13′32″W	Category C(S)	48902	Upload Photo
4 Succoth Place, Including Boundary Wall				55°56′59″N 3°14′13″W	Category C(S)	48916	Upload Photo
2 Wester Coates Avenue, Including Boundary Walls				55°56′50″N 3°13′42″W	Category B	48917	Upload Photo
12 Wester Coates Gardens, Including Gatepiers And Boundary Walls				55°56′54″N 3°13′49″W	Category C(S)	48919	Upload Photo
1 Abercorn Gardens With Boundary Wall And Railings				55°57′19″N 3°08′25″W	Category C(S)	49039	Upload Photo
14-17 (Inclusive Nos) Market Street				55°57′03″N 3°11′26″W	Category B	49066	Upload another image
2 Cranston Street, Former Canongate Christian Institute, Including Gatepiers				55°57′04″N 3°11′01″W	Category C(S)	49078	Upload Photo
63 East London Street, London Street Primary School, Including Girls' And Boys' Playsheds, Boundary Walls, Railings And Gatepiers				55°57′35″N 3°11′14″W	Category B	49146	Upload Photo
Royal Botanic Garden, Inverleith Row, Caledonian Hall (Former Royal Caledonian Horticultural Society Hall)				55°57′52″N 3°12′20″W	Category B	49214	Upload Photo
117 Nicolson Street, Southside Community Centre, Former Nicolson Street Church With Wall And Railings				55°56′39″N 3°11′03″W	Category B	49458	Upload another image
Castlebrae Business Centre (Former Niddrie Marischal School), Harewood Road, With Lodge				55°56′06″N 3°08′15″W	Category B	49459	Upload Photo
Holyrood Park, Meadowbank Lodge				55°57′16″N 3°09′28″W	Category C(S)	49513	Upload Photo
67 Whitehill Street, Newcraighall Primary School Including Boundary Wall And Gatepiers				55°56′06″N 3°05′17″W	Category C(S)	49520	Upload Photo
64 Bridge Road, The Royal Bank Of Scotland				55°54′27″N 3°15′31″W	Category C(S)	49553	Upload Photo
5 Spylaw Park				55°54′30″N 3°16′07″W	Category C(S)	49568	Upload Photo
East Fettes Avenue, Fettes College, Malcolm House				55°58′00″N 3°13′33″W	Category B	49630	Upload Photo
10-12 (Inclusive Nos) Brunton Place And 2 Brunton Terrace				55°57′28″N 3°10′27″W	Category B	49745	Upload Photo
12 Carlton Terrace Including Railings And Boundary Walls				55°57′24″N 3°10′26″W	Category A	49754	Upload another image
17 Regent Terrace Including Railings And Boundary Walls				55°57′18″N 3°10′35″W	Category A	49780	Upload another image
23 Regent Terrace, Including Railings And Boundary Walls				55°57′19″N 3°10′32″W	Category A	49786	Upload another image
29 Regent Terrace Including Railings And Boundary Walls				55°57′20″N 3°10′30″W	Category A	49794	Upload another image
9 Royal Terrace Including Railings And Boundary Walls				55°57′24″N 3°10′48″W	Category A	49807	Upload Photo
15 Royal Terrace Including Railings And Boundary Walls				55°57′24″N 3°10′45″W	Category A	49812	Upload Photo
26 Royal Terrace Including Railings And Boundary Walls				55°57′24″N 3°10′39″W	Category A	49817	Upload another image
40 George Square, University Of Edinburgh, Arts Faculty, David Hume Tower (Block A) And Lecture Block (Block B) Including Stepped Podium				55°56′36″N 3°11′12″W	Category A	50189	Upload another image
42 George Square, University Of Edinburgh, Arts Faculty, William Robertson Building (Block C)				55°56′38″N 3°11′12″W	Category B	50192	Upload Photo
55 Abbeyhill				55°57′16″N 3°10′25″W	Category B	51170	Upload another image
Holyroodhouse, Queen's Gallery (Former Holyrood Free Church And Former Free Church School)				55°57′09″N 3°10′26″W	Category B	51177	Upload another image
6 South Gray's Close, Panmure St Anne's (Former St Anne's School)				55°56′57″N 3°11′06″W	Category C(S)	51181	Upload Photo
Belford Road, Belford Bridge				55°57′03″N 3°13′19″W	Category B	51337	Upload another image
7 And 9 Laverockbank Avenue And 13-17 (Consecutive Nos) Laverockbank Crescent Including Lockup Garages				55°58′46″N 3°11′59″W	Category B	51773	Upload Photo
Dundas Castle Keep				55°58′31″N 3°24′54″W	Category A	45474	Upload Photo
Dundas Castle, Dundas Loch Bridge				55°58′03″N 3°24′39″W	Category B	45475	Upload Photo
106 St Stephen Street, Including Railings				55°57′29″N 3°12′20″W	Category C(S)	45521	Upload Photo
116 Fountainbridge, Fountainbridge Telephone Exchange Including Boundary Walls, Gatepiers And Gates				55°56′36″N 3°12′34″W	Category B	44933	Upload another image
48-52 (Even Nos) Leamington Terrace Including Boundary Walls, Gates And Railings				55°56′20″N 3°12′29″W	Category C(S)	44942	Upload Photo
98-106 (Even Nos) And 122 Willowbrae Road, Former Willowbrae House, Including Service Accommodation, Lodge And Boundary Walls And Railings				55°57′10″N 3°08′45″W	Category C(S)	44948	Upload Photo
5 And 7 Oak Lane Including Boundary Walls				55°57′15″N 3°16′54″W	Category C(S)	44753	Upload Photo
12 Kirk Loan, Corstorphine Public Library Including Boundary Walls, Gatepiers, Gates, Railings And Lamp Standards				55°56′27″N 3°16′51″W	Category C(S)	44764	Upload Photo
64-66 Albion Road, With Wall And Railings To Pavement				55°57′39″N 3°09′59″W	Category B	44625	Upload Photo
Mayfield Road And West Mains Road, University Of Edinburgh, King's Buildings, Zoology				55°55′26″N 3°10′23″W	Category B	44230	Upload another image
Observatory Road, Blackford Hill, The Royal Observatory, Gate Lodge, Gates, Gatepiers And Boundary Walls				55°55′23″N 3°11′14″W	Category B	44250	Upload Photo
42 Newhaven Main Street				55°58′50″N 3°11′41″W	Category B	43707	Upload Photo
243 Newhaven Road, Willow Bank, Including Boundary Wall And Gatepiers				55°58′47″N 3°11′36″W	Category C(S)	43714	Upload Photo
6 Wester Close				55°58′50″N 3°11′43″W	Category C(S)	43729	Upload Photo
Portgower Place, The Grange Cricket Club Pavilion				55°57′35″N 3°12′47″W	Category B	43497	Upload Photo
22 Hill Street				55°57′12″N 3°12′10″W	Category A	43304	Upload Photo
10-15 (Inclusive Nos) Princes Street				55°57′12″N 3°11′25″W	Category C(S)	43313	Upload Photo
21-23 (Inclusive Nos) Princes Street				55°57′12″N 3°11′28″W	Category C(S)	43314	Upload Photo
78 Princes Street And 2-4 Hanover Street				55°57′08″N 3°11′49″W	Category B	43320	Upload Photo
84-87 (Inclusive Nos) Princes Street, Incorporating The New Club				55°57′08″N 3°11′53″W	Category A	43322	Upload another image See more images
144-147 (Inclusive Nos) Princes Street				55°57′01″N 3°12′27″W	Category B	43328	Upload Photo
26 Thistle Street				55°57′15″N 3°11′57″W	Category C(S)	43362	Upload Photo
18 Young Street And 10 Young Street Lane South				55°57′10″N 3°12′21″W	Category A	43368	Upload Photo
Ellen's Glen Road (Off Lasswade Road), Southfield Hospital				55°54′33″N 3°09′01″W	Category B	43251	Upload Photo
31 And 33 Castle Street				55°57′08″N 3°12′11″W	Category B	43282	Upload Photo
111, 113 And 113A George Street With Railings				55°57′09″N 3°12′15″W	Category B	43288	Upload Photo
45-49 (Odd Nos) Hanover Street				55°57′11″N 3°11′48″W	Category B	43294	Upload Photo
29-33 Newington Road, Former Royal Bank Of Scotland				55°56′19″N 3°10′44″W	Category B	43160	Upload another image
3 Priestfield Road				55°56′08″N 3°10′05″W	Category C(S)	43165	Upload Photo
2-4 (Even Nos) Priestfield Road				55°56′07″N 3°10′04″W	Category C(S)	43167	Upload Photo
3 Priestfield Road North, Kingsview				55°56′12″N 3°10′03″W	Category C(S)	43171	Upload Photo
55 And 56 High Street				55°59′23″N 3°23′36″W	Category B	40383	Upload Photo
8 The Loan, Priory Lodge				55°59′24″N 3°23′51″W	Category C(S)	40393	Upload Photo
10 The Loan, Loan House				55°59′23″N 3°23′50″W	Category B	40394	Upload Photo
12-15 West Terrace, Wall And Railings				55°59′24″N 3°23′47″W	Category C(S)	40409	Upload Photo
1 And 2 Bellstane				55°59′27″N 3°23′51″W	Category C(S)	40334	Upload Photo
2 Brewery Close				55°59′23″N 3°23′47″W	Category C(S)	40336	Upload Photo
7 East Terrace				55°59′23″N 3°23′36″W	Category B	40339	Upload Photo
15 East Terrace				55°59′22″N 3°23′40″W	Category B	40344	Upload Photo
5 And 6 Stoneycroft Road, St. Catherine's Bank And Bonnyview				55°59′22″N 3°23′33″W	Category C(S)	40368	Upload Photo
7 Whitehouse Terrace Including Gatepiers And Boundary Walls				55°55′54″N 3°11′42″W	Category B	30676	Upload Photo
18-20 (Incl Nos) Warrender Park Crescent				55°56′19″N 3°12′04″W	Category B	30614	Upload Photo
53-55 (Odd Nos) Warrender Park Road				55°56′19″N 3°11′46″W	Category B	30621	Upload Photo
91-95 (Odd Nos) Warrender Park Road				55°56′18″N 3°11′55″W	Category B	30629	Upload Photo
103-105 (Odd Nos) Warrender Park Road				55°56′18″N 3°11′57″W	Category B	30631	Upload Photo
127 Warrender Park Road				55°56′16″N 3°12′03″W	Category B	30636	Upload Photo
11-13 (Incl Nos) Warrender Park Terrace Incl Railings				55°56′21″N 3°11′48″W	Category B	30648	Upload Photo
Whitehouse Loan Police Box				55°56′06″N 3°12′04″W	Category B	30662	Upload another image
123 Grange Loan Formerly Dunard Incl Gatepiers Boundary Wall				55°55′50″N 3°11′29″W	Category C(S)	30506	Upload Photo
1 Hope Terrace Including Boundary Walls				55°56′00″N 3°12′01″W	Category C(S)	30525	Upload Photo
21 Marchmont Road				55°56′20″N 3°11′41″W	Category B	30542	Upload Photo
20 Marchmont Road				55°56′19″N 3°11′43″W	Category B	30556	Upload Photo
111-115 (Odd Nos) Marchmont Road				55°56′07″N 3°11′38″W	Category B	30448	Upload another image
1-3 (Inclusive Nos) Roseneath Street				55°56′18″N 3°11′31″W	Category B	30464	Upload Photo
19 St Thomas Road				55°55′48″N 3°11′06″W	Category B	30472	Upload Photo
12-16 (Even Nos) Warrender Park Road				55°56′17″N 3°11′31″W	Category B	30488	Upload another image

== Key ==
The scheme for classifying buildings in Scotland is:

- Category A: "buildings of national or international importance, either architectural or historic; or fine, little-altered examples of some particular period, style or building type."
- Category B: "buildings of regional or more than local importance; or major examples of some particular period, style or building type, which may have been altered."
- Category C: "buildings of local importance; lesser examples of any period, style, or building type, as originally constructed or moderately altered; and simple traditional buildings which group well with other listed buildings."

In March 2016 there were 47,288 listed buildings in Scotland. Of these, 8% were Category A, and 50% were Category B, with the remaining 42% being Category C.

== See also ==
- List of listed buildings in Edinburgh
