= Johnson-Marshall =

Johnson-Marshall is a compound surname. Notable people with the surname include:

- Percy Johnson-Marshall (1915–1993), British urban designer
- Stirrat Johnson-Marshall (1912–1981), British architect
