= McDiarmid Park =

Football stadium in Perth, Scotland

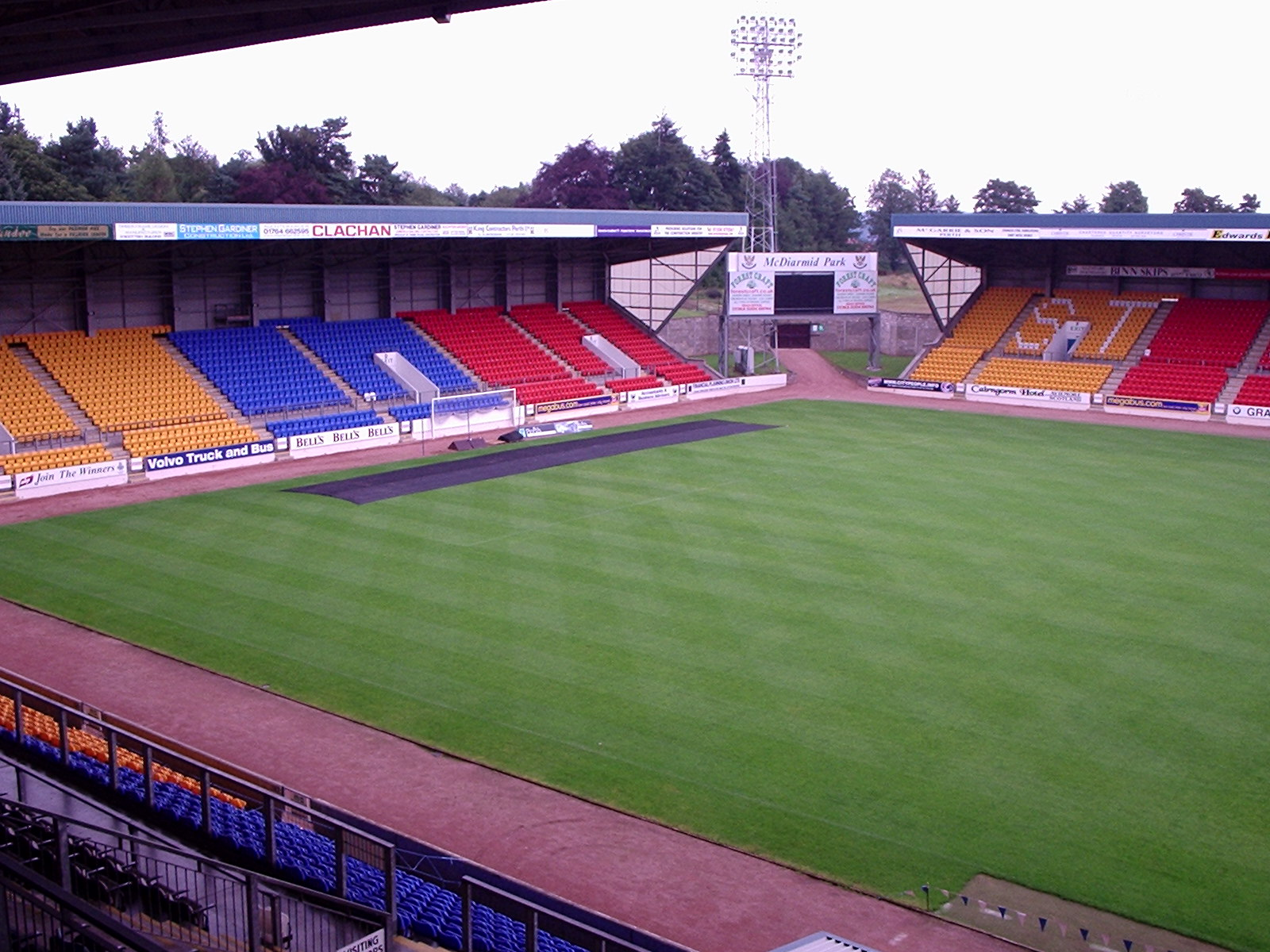
- View from the Main (West) Stand

- Location in Perth and Kinross
- Location: Tulloch, Perth, Scotland
- Coordinates: 56°24′35″N 3°28′37″W
- Owner: St Johnstone F.C.
- Capacity: 10,696
- Surface: Grass
- Field size: 115 x 75 yards (105 × 68.5 metres)
- Public transit: Stagecoach bus routes 1, 1A, 15 and 15A

Construction
- Opened: August 19, 1989 (37 years ago)
- Cost: £4.9 million
- Architect: Percy Johnson-Marshall
- Main contractor: Miller Construction

Tenants
- St Johnstone F.C. Caledonia Reds St Johnstone W.F.C.: 1989–present 1996–1998; 2018-present

McDiarmid Park is a stadium in Perth, Scotland, used mainly for association football. It has been the home ground of St Johnstone since its opening in 1989. The stadium has an all-seated capacity of 10,696.

As well as St Johnstone matches, McDiarmid Park has been chosen to host the final of the Scottish Challenge Cup on nine occasions. It has also been used for rugby union, including a full international between Scotland and Japan in 2004, several Scotland A fixtures, and some home matches of the former Caledonia Reds team.

== History ==
St Johnstone had played at Muirton Park since 1924, but it had fallen into disrepair by the 1980s. St Johnstone was then a Second Division club and did not have the funds to repair it. In December 1986 the club received the news that Asda wanted to purchase Muirton Park and the adjoining ice rink to build a supermarket on the site. In return, the club would be relocated, at no cost to them, to a brand-new stadium at the western edge of the city. A local farmer, Bruce McDiarmid, donated 16 acres of land at his Newton of Huntingtower Farm, on which the stadium now stands. The going rate for the land at that time would have been approximately £400,000 but Bruce McDiarmid saw a donation of his "berry and barley fields" as a gift to the people of Perth. At the insistence of St Johnstone he accepted a 20 per cent shareholding and the title of honorary president of the football club. The Taylor Report noted that there had been a happy "confluence of factors" that allowed St Johnstone to make this development. McDiarmid died in 1999, aged 88.

The stadium was designed by Percy Johnson-Marshall and built by Miller Construction. The stadium was a prototype and based on legislative advice that was soon to become out of date, but a good facility was built for a reasonable cost. Work started on the Tulloch farmland donated by Bruce McDiarmid in December 1988 and was finished in time for the start of the 1989–90 season. Although McDiarmid Park was opened after the Hillsborough disaster, all of the planning and most of the construction work had been done beforehand. Lord Justice Taylor visited the ground as part of his inquiry into the disaster.

The first match at McDiarmid Park was played on 19 August 1989, a 2–1 victory for Saints in a First Division match against Clydebank. This league fixture on the opening day of the season was deliberately kept low-key as a glamour challenge match had been arranged for the official opening. On 17 October 1989, St Johnstone lined up against English club Manchester United, who brought a full strength side to Scotland. The Manchester United team, managed by former St Johnstone player Alex Ferguson, included Jim Leighton, Steve Bruce, Gary Pallister, Bryan Robson, Paul Ince, Brian McClair, Mark Hughes and Lee Sharpe. McClair scored the only goal of the game, in front of a near capacity (9,780) crowd. The legendary Sir Matt Busby and Bobby Charlton were also in attendance. With just 30 minutes played of the match, the stadium was temporarily plunged into darkness caused by a fault at an electricity substation. Although the stadium's emergency generators were able to provide lighting in the stands, it was 23 minutes before play was resumed.

St Johnstone enjoyed great success when the stadium first opened. The club won promotion to the Premier Division in their first season at McDiarmid. In the first season back in the top flight, the average attendance at McDiarmid was 6,000, approximately three times what it had been at Muirton. These high attendances led the club to create space for another 600 seats, raising the capacity to over 10,700. A record home attendance of 10,721 was set by a home game against Rangers on 26 February 1991. McDiarmid Park also hosted matches of the Scotland under-21 team and the Scotland women's national team. By the mid-1990s, however, attendances had drifted down to below 4,000, although this was still nearly double what they had been at Muirton.

In 2011, plans to demolish the 2,000 capacity North Stand were publicised. This would have allowed a commuter link road from the neighbouring A9 road to be built. St Johnstone chairman Geoff Brown justified the proposal on the grounds that comparable clubs, such as Inverness and St Mirren, have since built grounds with smaller capacities. The proposals were rejected by Perth and Kinross Council.

== Structure and facilities ==
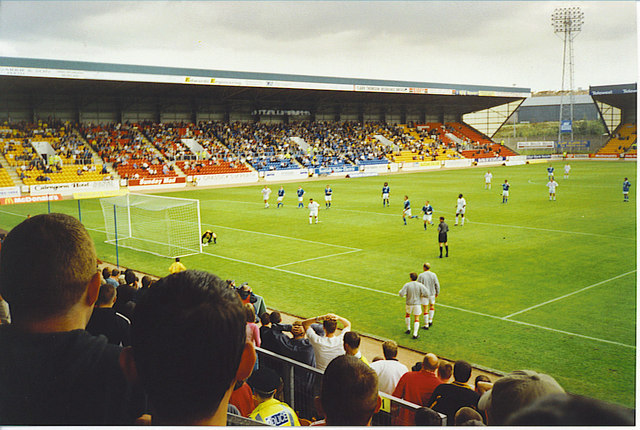
St Johnstone hosting Aberdeen at McDiarmid Park in 2001. View is from the North Stand.

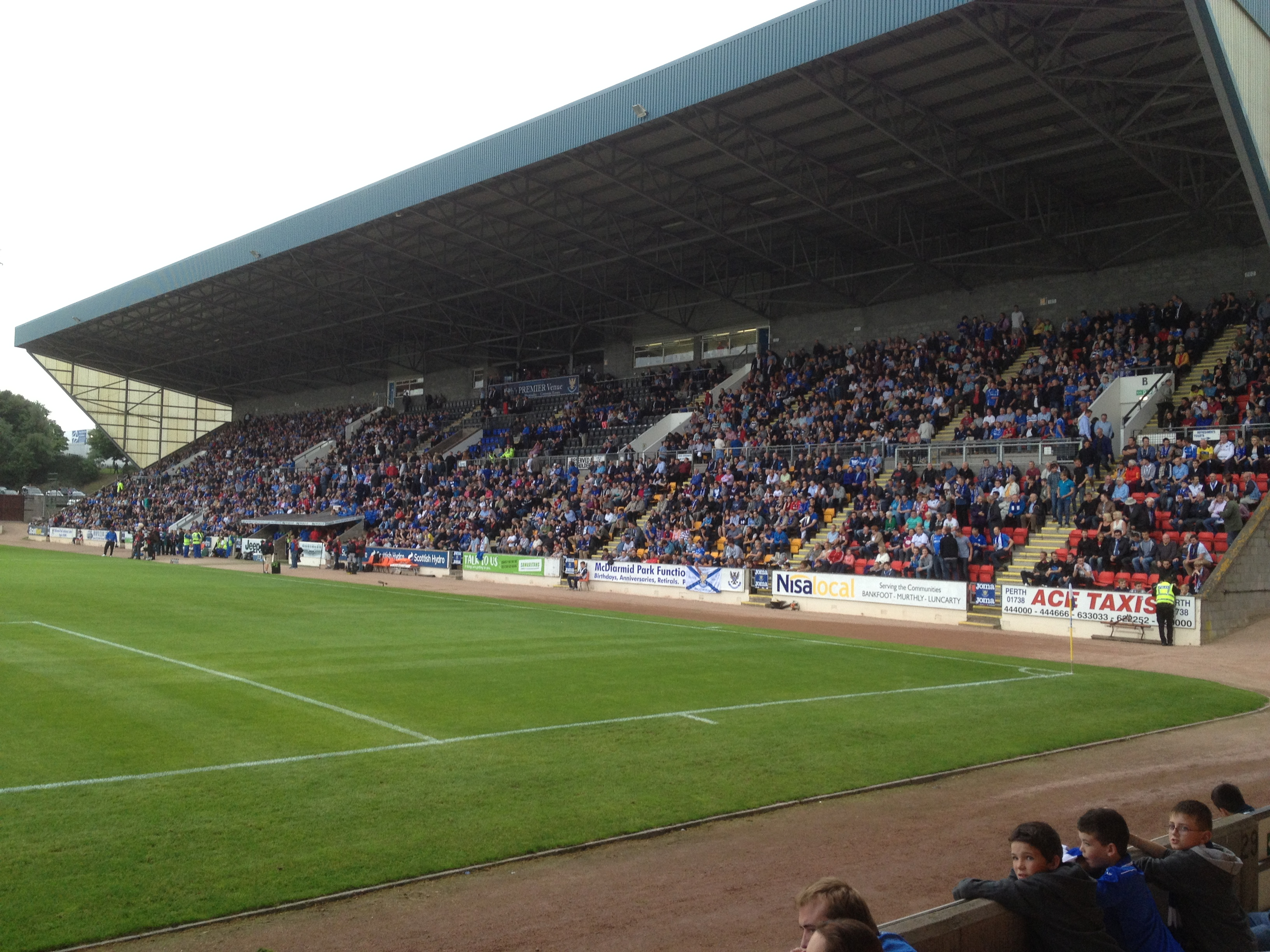
West Stand (2013)

McDiarmid Park, the first purpose-built all-seater stadium in the United Kingdom, consists of four covered, single-tier stands. Facilities include parking for 1,000 cars and 100 coaches, a synthetic playing surface adjacent to the ground (which is used as the team's training ground), and conference facilities within the Main (West) Stand. The stands are all of a similar height, with the Main Stand, on the western side of the ground, being slightly taller. The Main Stand also has greater leg room between rows of seats and includes an area with padded seats reserved for season-ticket holders, club officials and their guests. In the north-east corner of the ground there is a scoreboard, which was upgraded from electronic to digital in 2024. The floodlights at McDiarmid are the same ones used at Muirton Park. The club also tried to retain the square goalposts used at Muirton, but the timber frames could not be re-erected.

The South Stand is named the Ormond Stand, after Willie Ormond, a successful manager of St Johnstone who left the club in 1973 to manage Scotland. The Ormond Stand also houses the club's souvenir shop, which is only open on match days before and after the match. It was formerly nominated as a "family stand", for home fans and fans of the visiting club to sit together. The club has a number of options for housing visiting fans. Visiting supports of a few hundred or less are housed in a segregated section at the north end of the main stand, with the two end stands closed. Clubs who regularly bring a larger support are also allocated the North Stand. If a very large visiting support is expected the club has a further option to also open the Ormond Stand for away fans.

Being a prototype stadium, McDiarmid Park has some faults that critics of seated stadia picked upon. Spectators in the front rows of the stands are not necessarily sheltered, while the stadium has been criticised for lacking atmosphere. St Johnstone are routinely praised for their pricing structure especially for visiting families sitting in the Ormond/Family stand.

== Other uses ==
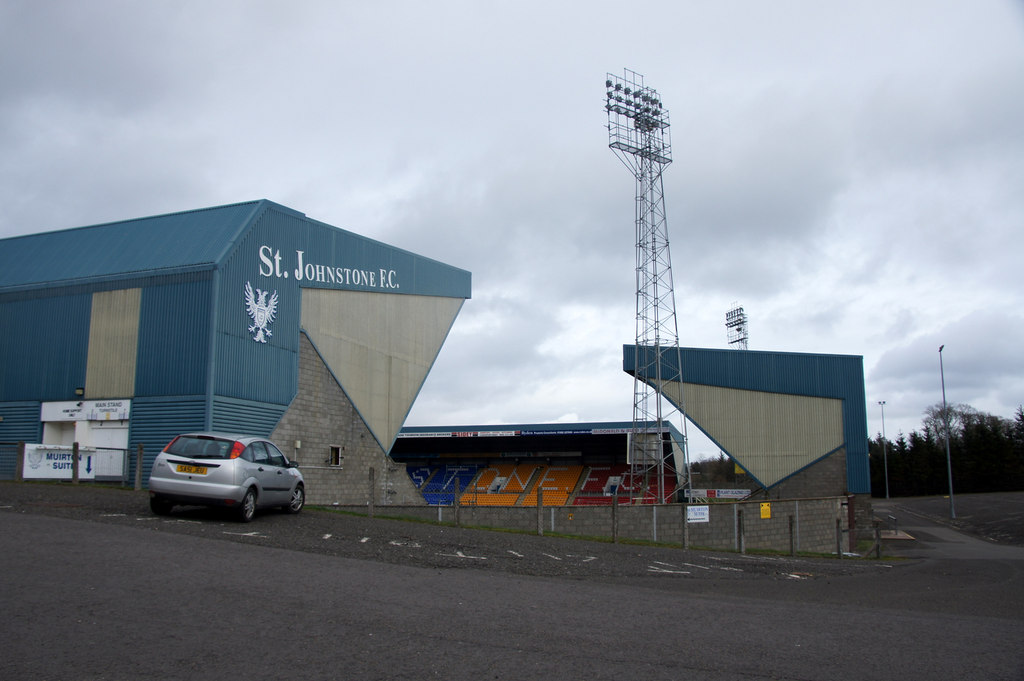
A view of McDiarmid Park from the car park, looking north-east

=== Scottish League Challenge Cup Final ===
The final of the Challenge Cup is often held at McDiarmid Park because of its capacity and the fair distance it is in relation to most teams who have contested the cup in the SPFL. McDiarmid Park isn't the sole host as finals have also been played at Fir Park (Motherwell), Broadwood Stadium (Cumbernauld), Excelsior Stadium (Airdrie) Easter Road Stadium (Edinburgh), Caledonian Stadium (Inverness), and Almondvale Stadium (Livingston).

=== Rugby Union ===
Professional rugby union side Caledonia Reds played some of their home games at McDiarmid Park before they were merged with the Glasgow Warriors in 1998. The merged Warriors initially played some of their 1999 games in Perth, but eventually switched all home games to Glasgow.

On 13 November 2004 the Scotland national rugby union team played Japan there in a historic first test match north of the River Forth. The result was a 100–8 scoreline in favour of Scotland, the first time the Scottish rugby team had scored a century. Chris Paterson scored 40 points (three tries, 11 conversions and one penalty).

The stadium has hosted several of Scotland's "A" team: a victory over Italy in 1999, a draw over Argentina in 1999, a win against Samoa in 2000, and a loss to Italy in 2003. On 21 November 2006, Scotland "A" faced Australia in Perth, their first appearance on home soil in three years. On 23 February 2007, Scotland "A" hosted Italy at McDiarmid Park.

=== Non-sporting usage ===
For many years the stadium hosted the Scottish convention of Jehovah's Witnesses, which brought thousands of worshippers to the local area every summer. In July 2009, a mass baptism was held, which included the use of a 33-foot-diameter (10 m) pool. Over 8,000 people attended the three-day event. The 2012 convention was their last year at the stadium as the religious organisation opted to use The SSE Hydro arena at the Scottish Exhibition and Conference Centre in Glasgow for their national convention.

On 6 July 2008, Elton John became the first musician to play at the stadium.

== See also ==
- Stadium relocations in Scottish football
