= Robert Matthew =

Scottish architect (1906–1975)

Robert Matthew OBE FRIBA FRSE
- Matthew in 1960
- Born: 12 December 1906; Edinburgh, Scotland
- Died: 2 June 1975 (aged 68)
- Education: Edinburgh Institution; Edinburgh College of Art
- Occupation: Architect
- Spouse: Lorna Pilcher (m. 1931)
- Children: 3

Sir Robert Hogg Matthew OBE FRIBA FRSE (12 December 1906 – 2 June 1975) was a Scottish architect and a leading proponent of modernism.

== Early life and studies ==
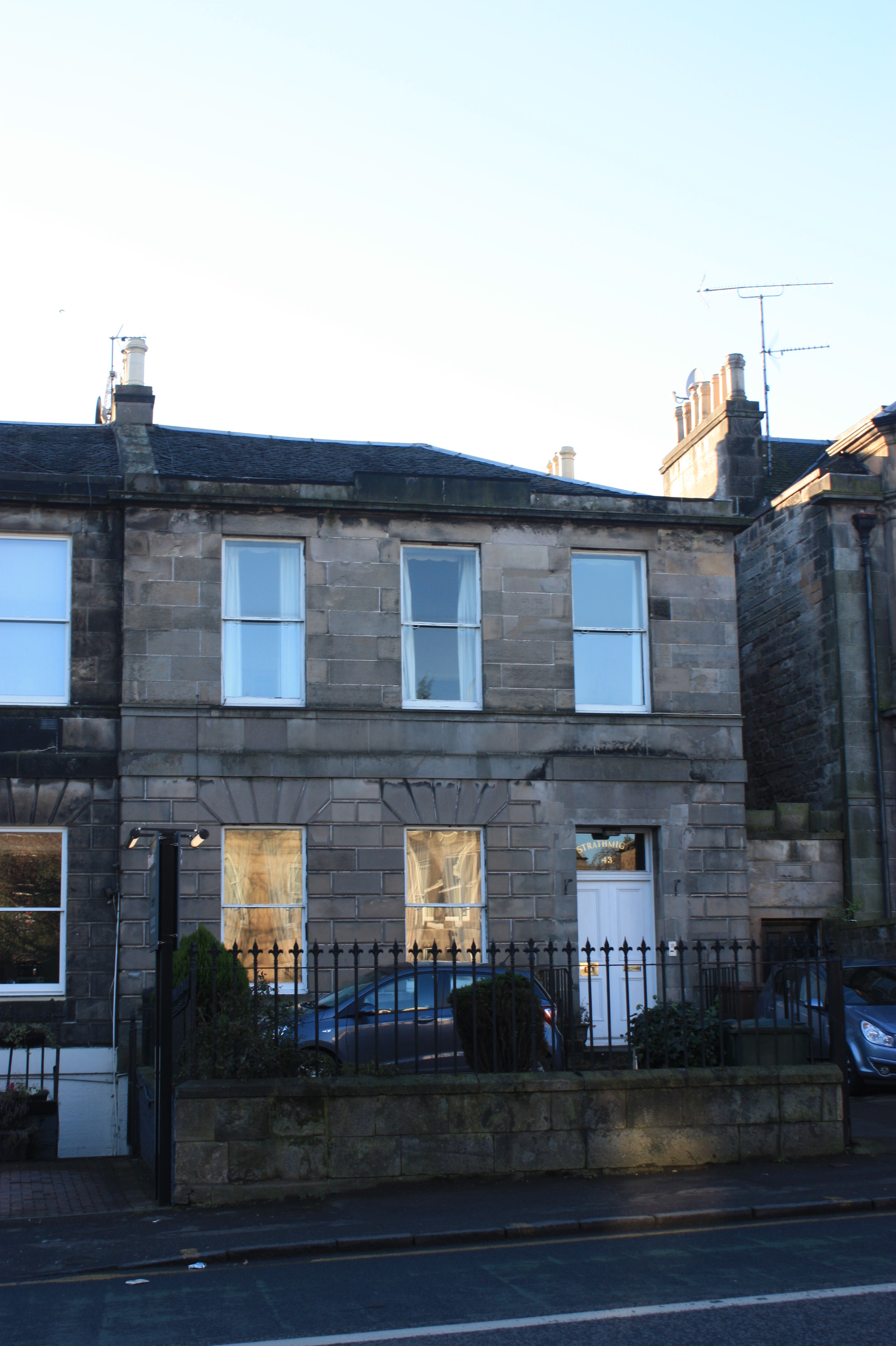
The Matthew home at 43 Minto Street, Edinburgh

Robert Matthew was the son of John Fraser Matthew (1875–1955) (also an architect, and the partner of Sir Robert Lorimer) and his wife, Annie Broadfoot Hogg.

From 1920 the family lived at 43 Minto Street ironically the epitome of Georgian classicism rather than modern architecture.

Robert was born and brought up in Edinburgh, was educated at Edinburgh Institution and attended the Edinburgh College of Art where he studied under John Begg.

== Family life ==
In 1931 Matthew married Lorna Pilcher. They had three children: Robert Aidan Matthew, born in July 1936, Janet Frances Catriona Matthew, born in March 1939, and Jessie Ann Matthew born in June 1952. From 1939 they lived at 12 Darnaway Street, Edinburgh and from 1956 they lived at Keith Marischal House, Humbie, East Lothian.

== Career ==
Robert was apprenticed with his father's firm. Then in 1936, he joined the Department of Health for Scotland, as assistant to John Wilson, where, by 1945, he replaced Wilson as Chief Architect and Planning Officer. He was stranded in Sweden for VE Day. However he spent the time designing kits for prefabricated houses which conformed to the recommendations of the 1944 UK government report Planning our New Homes. This led to the importation of over 2,000 Swedish post-war prefabricated houses.

In 1946 Matthew moved to London, becoming Chief Architect and Planning Officer to the London County Council, where he served from 1946 to 1953, working on the post-war reconstruction of Greater London and masterminding the Festival of Britain including such buildings as the Royal Festival Hall, 1951. It was during these formative postwar years that the LCC's housing and town planning policy established an international reputation, and many housing schemes (including the famous Roehampton housing estate) were created, as well as many schools.

In 1956 with Stirrat Johnson-Marshall, Robert Matthew established the firm of RMJM (Robert Matthew, Johnson Marshall) in Edinburgh and London. Their first project was New Zealand House in the Haymarket, London (now considered one of Matthew's key buildings). In 1953 he returned to Edinburgh to become the first Professor of Architecture at the University of Edinburgh, where he established the new Department of Architecture in collaboration with RMJM, in a manner that has been compared to that of Walter Gropius at the Bauhaus. He continued as Professor there until 1968. The Matthew Architecture Gallery is now housed in the Department in his honour.

Matthew was closely involved with Basil Spence and Alan Reiach in the University's development plan for George Square, which ultimately resulted in the demolition of buildings on three sides of the square, and their replacement with modernist structures. Matthew/RMJM were directly responsible for the design of the Arts Faculty buildings, now called 40 George Square (formerly David Hume Tower), the Adam Ferguson building and the William Robertson Building.

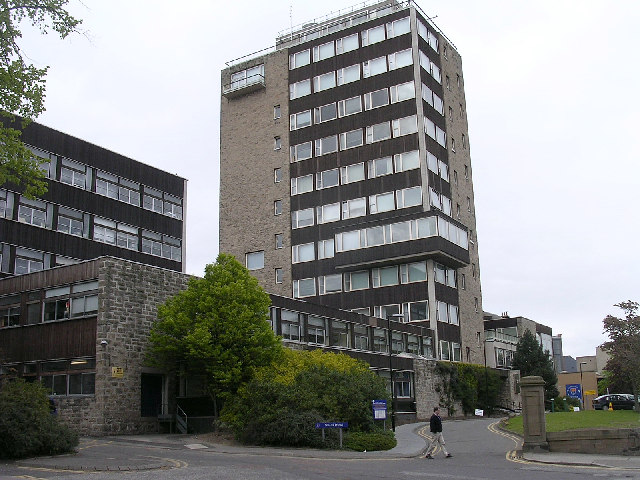
Tower Building, University of Dundee (1961)

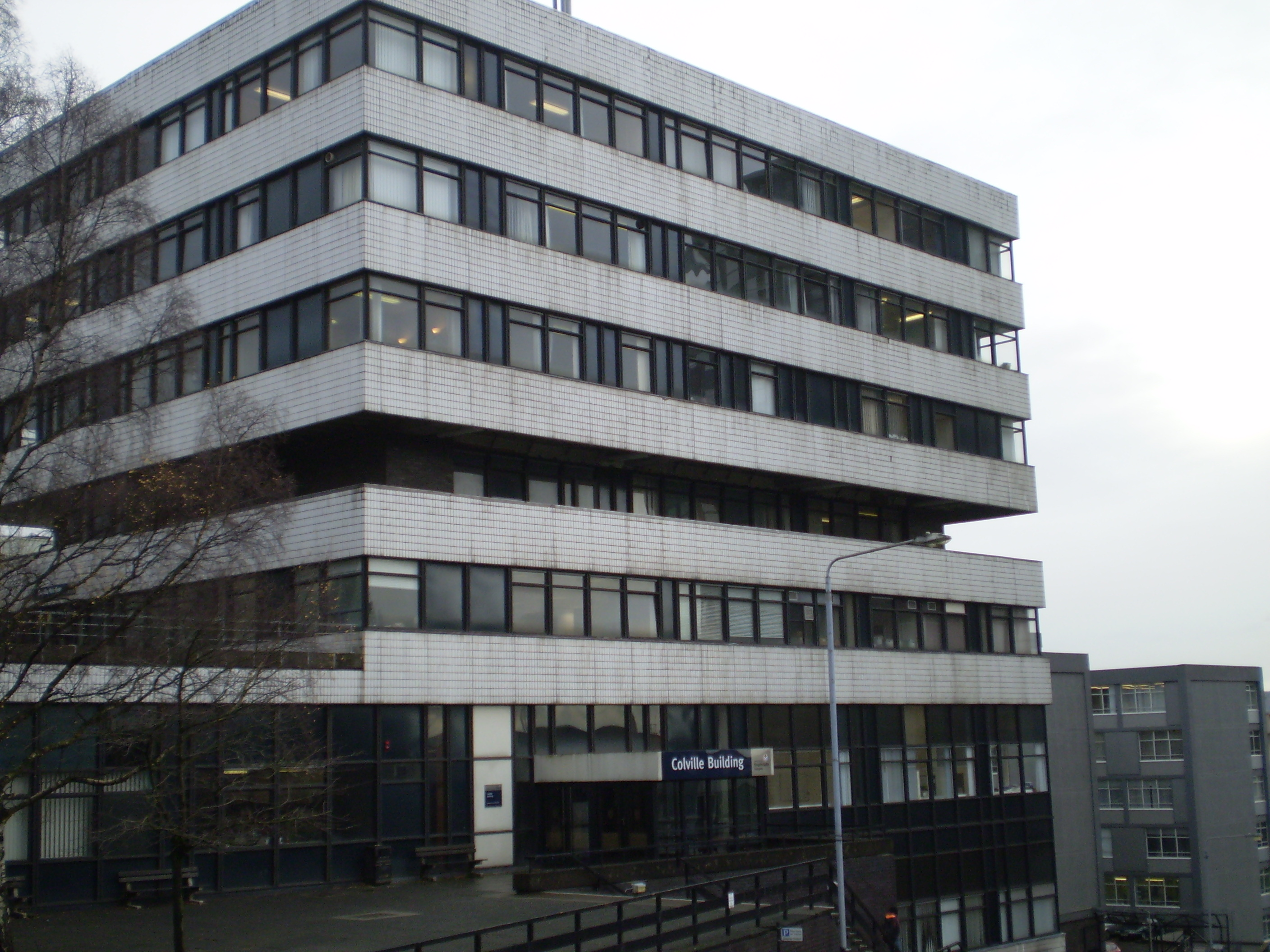
Colville Building, University of Strathclyde (1967)

In the early 1960s Matthew was involved in the replacement of overcrowded, insanitary tenement housing in Hutchesontown, Glasgow with high rise tower blocks. He worked alongside Basil Spence in the planning and design of the controversial Area C blocks in the Gorbals. Independently of Spence, RMJM designed the adjacent Area B estate which unlike the ill-fated Area C blocks, has survived and are now the only surviving high rise blocks in the Gorbals.

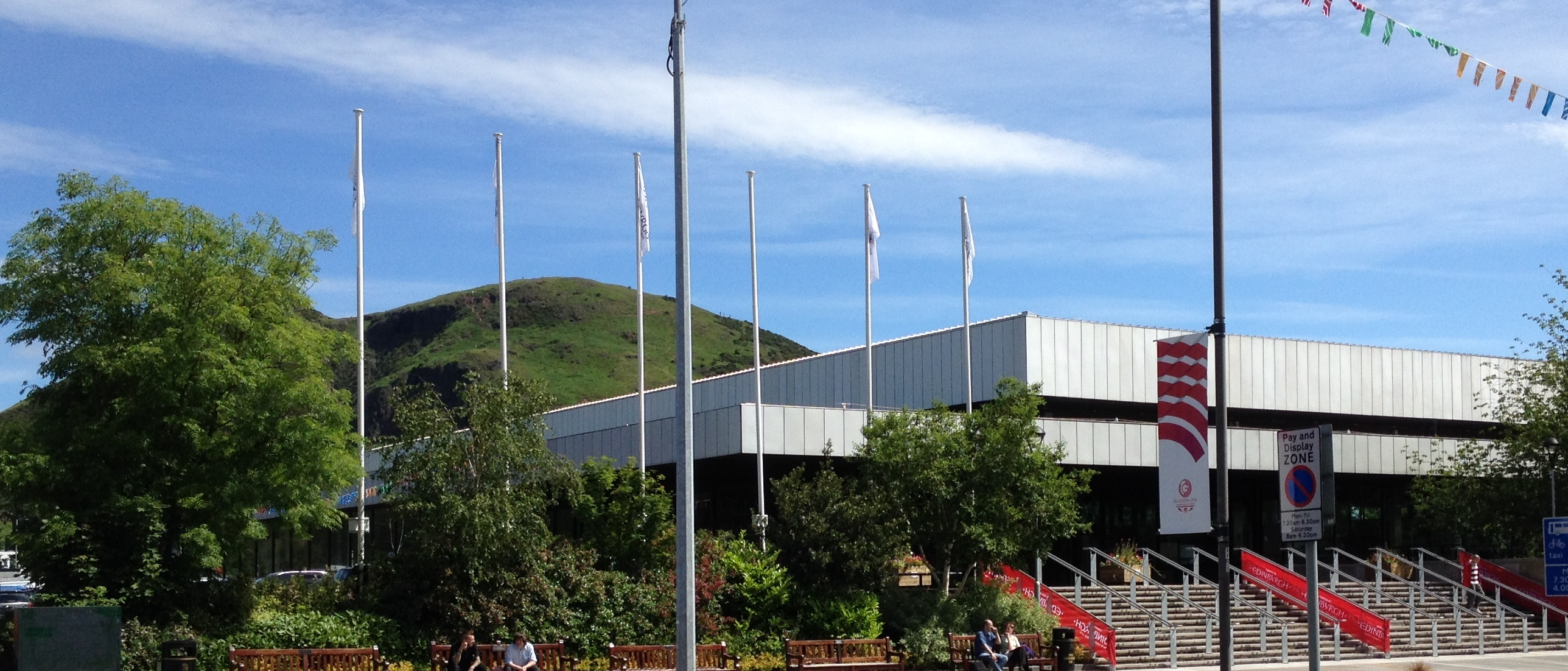
The Royal Commonwealth Pool (1970)

In Edinburgh he was also behind the Royal Commonwealth Pool, British Home Stores on Princes Street, Edinburgh Airport, Lothian Regional Council Building and Wester Hailes Education Centre.

Elsewhere Matthew/RMJM were both involved in the design for various academic campuses – one of his earliest commissions was the Tower Building for the University of Dundee in 1961 – at the time the tallest structure in the city. RMJM were also closely involved with the Royal College of Science and Technology in Glasgow, developing its campus masterplan in the early 1960s when it received its Royal Charter to become the University of Strathclyde, designing the Colville Building in tandem with Frank Fielden's celebrated Architecture School in 1966.

Later the practice was involved with the University of Stirling and University of York. RMJM also contributed to Pakistan's new capital buildings in Islamabad.

== Honours ==
During his studies Robert Matthew won the Pugin Student award (1929) and was Soane medallist (1932). He became a Fellow of the RIBA in 1955 and served as its President from 1962 to 1964. He was awarded an OBE in 1952 and knighted in 1962. He was later also President of the Commonwealth Association of Architects (CAA) and President of the International Union of Architects (UIA).

== Other arts ==
Apart from his work as an architect, Matthew produced drawings that were widely exhibited, and also paintings, although they are less well known. Both display the same aesthetic concerns as Le Corbusier, Pablo Picasso and Henry Moore all of whom he was able to count among his friends and colleagues.
