= Informatics Forum =

Coordinates: 55°56′41″N 3°11′14.5″W

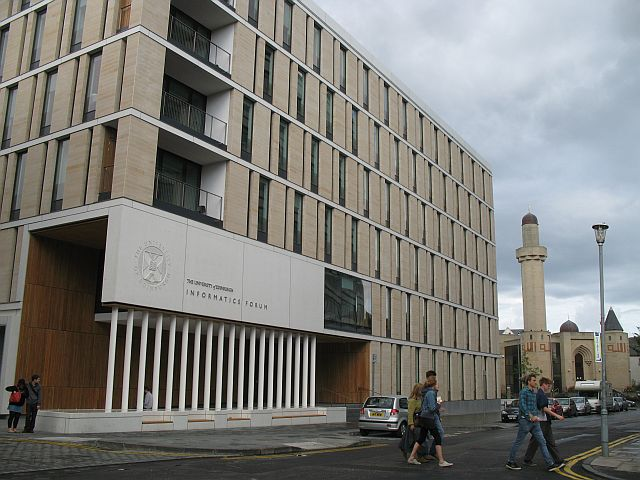
The Informatics Forum, as seen from Crichton Street.

The Informatics Forum is a major building on the Central Area campus of the University of Edinburgh. Completed in 2008, it houses the research institutes of the university's School of Informatics.

== Design ==
The Forum is designed by Bennetts Associates with Reiach and Hall, architects, and Buro Happold, engineers. The architects' brief was to provide a "forum for interaction" that will foster synergies among the 500 researchers in Informatics: Artificial Intelligence, Cognitive Science, Computer Science, and Systems Biology, who have been brought together, under one roof, by this development.

The building was the first in Scotland to achieve a BREEAM rating of "excellent", and was constructed by Balfour Beatty.

== History ==
One of the major recommendations of the 1997 international review that led to the formation of Informatics as an academic grouping at Edinburgh, was that the university should provide a building for the collocation of Informatics. An options appraisal recommended that the university should plan for the collocation of Informatics in a new construction within the university's George Square Campus, using the long-vacant Crichton Street site.

In 2002, the university embarked on a fund-raising campaign. This was followed closely by the Edinburgh Cowgate Fire of December 2002, which destroyed a number of buildings, including some of the school's accommodation at 80 South Bridge. The school took over four floors of the Appleton Tower as emergency accommodation. In the following years, plans for the school's accommodation were revised to include six floors of the Appleton Tower, and a new building on the Crichton Street Site.

In all, £42M was raised from public and philanthropic sources. Planning approval was confirmed on 12 September 2005, and work on site commenced in October 2005. The Informatics Forum was opened by then First Minister Alex Salmond in September 2008.

The Forum is the first phase of the Potterrow Project, the redevelopment of a site, bordered by Potterrow, Crichton Street, Charles Street and Marshall Street, that was cleared for redevelopment by the university in 1963, and has been used as a car park ever since. The Potterrow Project is itself part of a more extensive masterplan, that will see the Potterrow underpass removed and the campus extended to link Old College to George Square.

== Awards ==
The Informatics Forum, as part of the wider Potterrow development, was joint winner of the RIAS Andrew Doolan Best Building in Scotland Award in 2008.

== Photographs ==
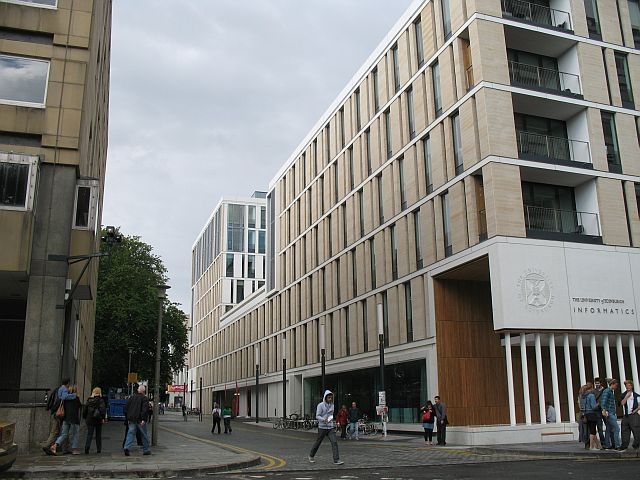

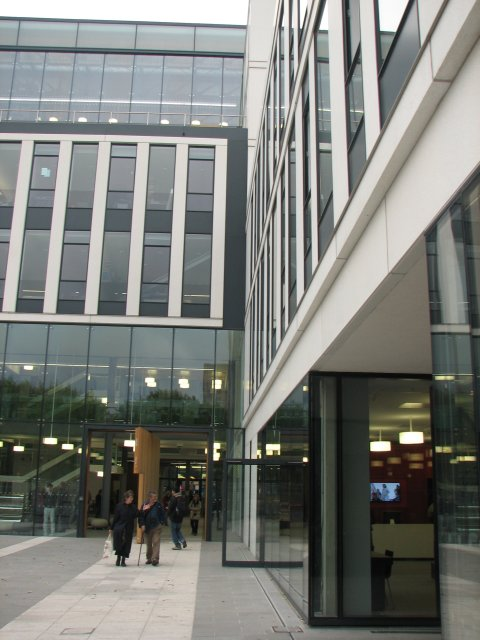

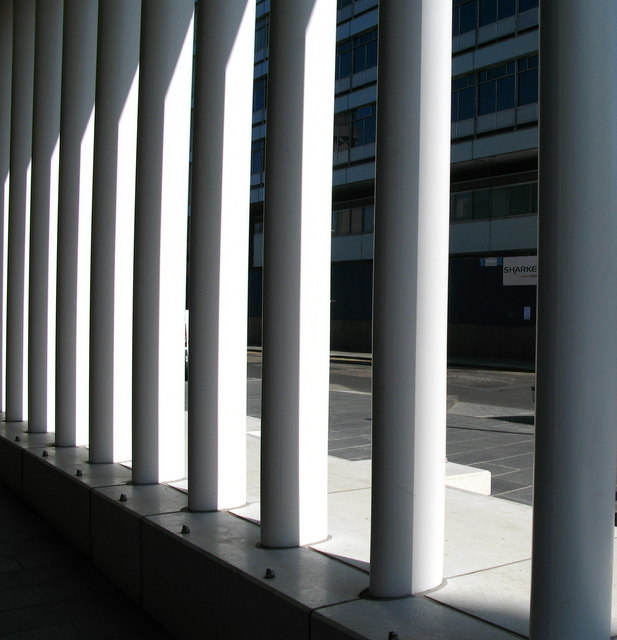

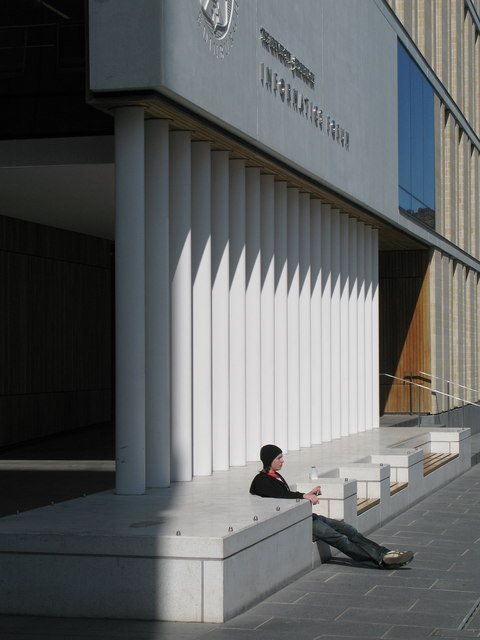

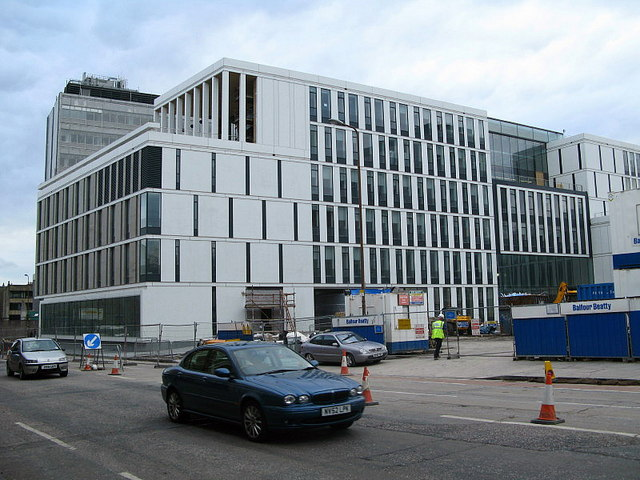
