= Swedish post-war prefabricated houses =

Houses assembled in Britain from parts prefabricated in Sweden

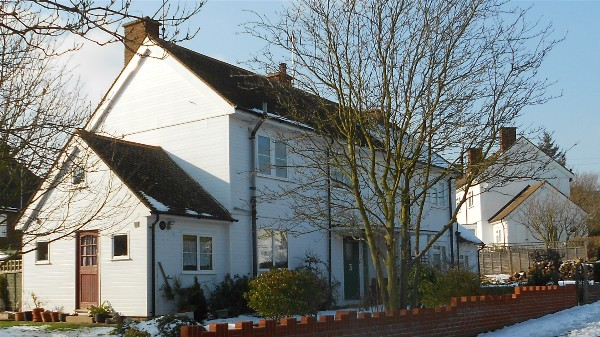
Swedish Timber Framed House at Shorne, Kent.

Swedish post-war prefabricated houses were a response to the housing shortage in Great Britain following the Second World War. 5,000 homes were built from kits made in Sweden and assembled on site. The first of these houses were built at Abbots Langley, Hertfordshire, in January 1946. The Housing (Temporary Accommodation) Act 1944 planned the building of 300,000 prefab houses in Britain over the next four years. They were to have a structural lifetime of between 10 and 15 years. In the end just over 150,000 were built. They were a gift of the Swedish government. They are an example of the use of "prefabs'" to deal with the post-war housing shortage in the UK. Many survive to this day and some have become listed buildings.

== Origins ==
Scandinavian wooden prefabricated houses had been introduced to Scotland in 1920, with Dundee Corporation building 556, Aberdeen Corporation 76 and from 1937 the Scottish Special Housing Association 350. Robert Matthew, in 1945 Chief Architect in the Department of Health for Scotland was stranded in Sweden for VE Day. However he spent the time designing kits for prefabricated houses which conformed to the recommendations of the 1944 UK government report Planning our New Homes.
