= 40 George Square =

University building in City of Edinburgh, Scotland

Coordinates: 55.94318°N 3.18665°W

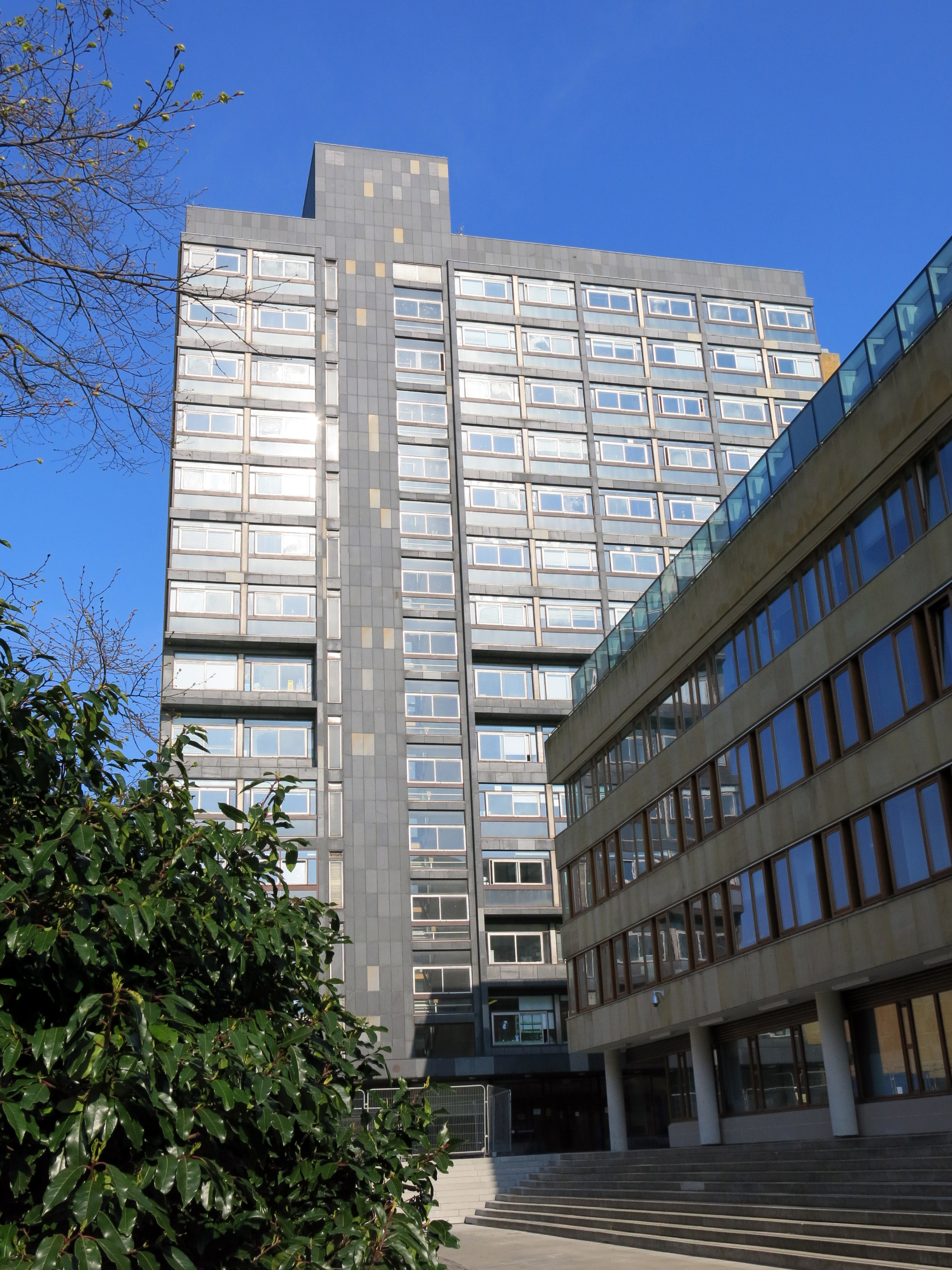
- View from George Square
- Interactive map of the 40 George Square area
- Former names: David Hume Tower, DHT

General information
- Type: University tower block
- Architectural style: Scottish Modernism
- Location: Edinburgh, Scotland
- Construction started: 1960
- Completed: 1963
- Owner: The University of Edinburgh

Height
- Height: 43 m (141 ft)

Technical details
- Structural system: Reinforced concrete with brick infill
- Floor count: 14

Design and construction
- Architect: Robert Matthew
- Architecture firm: Robert Matthew Johnson-Marshall & Partners (RMJM)
- Structural engineer: Blyth & Blyth

Renovating team
- Architect: Page\Park
- Renovating firm: Balfour Beatty
- Services engineer: Harley Haddow LLP

40 George Square is a tower block in Edinburgh, Scotland forming part of the University of Edinburgh. Until September 2020 the tower was named David Hume Tower (often abbreviated as DHT). The building contains lecture theatres, teaching spaces, offices, a café and a shop.

== Name ==
The tower was originally named after the Scottish Enlightenment philosopher David Hume, who was an alumnus of the university. In September 2020, in response to the Black Lives Matter movement, the university announced that they would be renaming the tower to 40 George Square. The university stated that Hume's "comments on matters of race, though not uncommon at the time, rightly cause distress today."

== Background ==
The tower was built as part of a significant 1960s redevelopment of George Square by the university, which saw the demolition of numerous Georgian terraced houses and tenements to make way for new university buildings. The redevelopments were opposed by community groups and organisations, such as the Cockburn Association and the Scottish Georgian Society. Other buildings constructed included the university's Main Library and Appleton Tower.

== Design and construction ==
The building was designed for the university's Arts Faculty by the Scottish modernist architect Robert Matthew of Robert Matthew Johnson-Marshall & Partners (RMJM), alongside the structural engineering firm Blyth & Blyth.

The tower is 43 metres (141 ft), and 14 storeys high. To the rear of the tower there is a row of lecture theatres, which are joined to the tower via a lower ground floor. The lower ground floor, known as the Hub, includes a café and shop surrounding a central atrium.

The structure of the tower is made from reinforced concrete with brick infill, and is clad with slabs of polished black slate and York sandstone. The block of lecture theatres is similarly made of reinforced concrete and clad in York sandstone.

The construction took place from 1960 until 1963, and was carried out by the contractor firm Crudens.

In 2006 Historic Scotland designated the building as category A listed, the highest category, stating the building is "one of the key monuments of Scottish Modernism", the architecture is of a "very high standard of design and execution" and the materials to be of "exceptional quality"

== Renovation ==
In 2014, the lower ground floor was renovated to create the DHT Hub, including teaching space, a café and a EUSA shop. The renovations cost £15 million and won the RICS Conservation Award, Scottish Design Awards commendation, and a GIA Awards commendation.
