= Percy Johnson-Marshall =

British urban designer (1915–1993)

Percy Johnson-Marshall CMG
- Born: Percy Edwin Alan Johnson-Marshall; 20 January 1915; Ajmer, British Raj
- Died: 14 July 1993 (aged 78)
- Education: Liverpool University
- Relatives: Stirrat Johnson-Marshall (brother)
- Engineering career
- Practice name: Percy Johnson-Marshall & Associates

Percy Edwin Alan Johnson-Marshall CMG (20 January 1915 – 14 July 1993) was a British urban designer, regional planner and academic. Born in India, he was educated at Liverpool University, and worked initially with local authorities in the south of England. In 1959, he took a post as senior lecturer at the University of Edinburgh, and was appointed Professor of Urban Design and Regional Planning in 1964.

In 1962, he founded the planning consultancy Percy Johnson-Marshall & Associates, commissioned to masterplan the University of Edinburgh's Comprehensive Development Area in the 1960s. The practice involved urban planning and redevelopment in the UK and abroad. He is well known for being the main Architect of Celtic Park.

== Early life and work ==
Johnson-Marshall was born in Ajmer, India, to English parents, and was raised in England from the 1920s. He attended the School of Architecture at the University of Liverpool, where his older brother, Stirrat Johnson-Marshall, was already studying. Tutors at Liverpool included Sir Patrick Abercrombie and Sir Charles Herbert Reilly. After graduating in 1936 he worked for Middlesex County Council, then for Willesden Borough Council, before moving to Coventry City Council in 1938, where he worked as Senior Assistant Architect under Chief Architect Donald Gibson, until called up for war service in 1941. He was elected to the Royal Institute of British Architects (RIBA) in 1938.

During the Second World War he served with the Royal Engineers in India and Burma, attaining the rank of Major. Post-war, he remained in Burma for a year, advising the Burmese Government on planning and reconstruction, and preparing a reconstruction plan for the country, in collaboration with William Tatton Brown. After his return to the UK, he was employed as an Assistant Regional Planning Officer at the new Ministry of Town and Country Planning, during which time the Town and Country Planning Act 1947, the first planning law in the UK, was drawn up. In 1947, he was elected member of the Royal Town Planning Institute (RTPI), as a council member and of the Education Committee. In 1948, he gained a Diploma in Town Planning from the School of Planning and Research for Regional Development (SPRRD), London, where he later worked as a part-time teacher. Johnson-Marshall worked as a Senior Planner with London County Council from 1949 to 1959, overseeing several Comprehensive Development Areas, including Lansbury Estate.

== Academic career ==
In 1959, Johnson-Marshall was appointed Senior Lecturer in the University of Edinburgh's Department of Architecture. A new department of Urban Design and Regional Planning was established in 1964, with Percy Johnson-Marshall as the first professor, within the School of the Built Environment headed by Sir Robert Matthew. He founded the planning Research Unit at the University, which was involved in preparing several regional plans for areas of southern Scotland, and undertook regional surveys for the Scottish Development Department. In 1966 his book Rebuilding Cities was published.

In recognition of his services to the planning profession, Johnson-Marshall was made a Companion of the Order of St Michael and St George (CMG) in 1975. In 1985 he retired from the professorship, to become director of the Patrick Geddes Centre for Planning Studies. He suffered an illness in 1987–1988, and retired as director as a result.

== Private practice ==
Percy Johnson-Marshall & Associates (PJMA) was established as a planning consultancy in 1962. The firm was founded following Johnson-Marshall's appointment as planning consultant to the University of Edinburgh, and specialised in urban design and regional planning. The practice undertook master plans for cities including São Paulo, Brazil, Porto, Portugal, and Islamabad in Pakistan. Within the UK, PJMA worked on redevelopment schemes in towns including Newcastle-upon-Tyne, Coleraine, Northern Ireland, Kilmarnock, Ayrshire, and Salford in Greater Manchester.

After 1980, Johnson-Marshall's input declined, and the practice became more architecture-focused. Following Johnson-Marshall's retirement in 1985, the firm was known as Percy Johnson-Marshall & Partners (PJMP) until it was rebranded in 2003 as jmarchitects. The firm acquired Glasgow practice McKeown Alexander in 2001, and Edinburgh architects Wheeler & Sproson in 2005, and now employs nearly 150 people in five offices across the UK.

Johnson-Marshall's brother Stirrat co-founded the architecture practice Robert Matthew Johnson Marshall, now known as RMJM, in 1956, with Sir Robert Matthew.

National Life Stories conducted an oral history interview (C467/2) with Percy Johnson-Marshall in 1990 for its Architects Lives' collection held by the British Library.
