= Varyap Meridian A Block =

Mixed-use development in Ataşehir, Istanbul, Turkey

Varyap Meridian Grand Tower
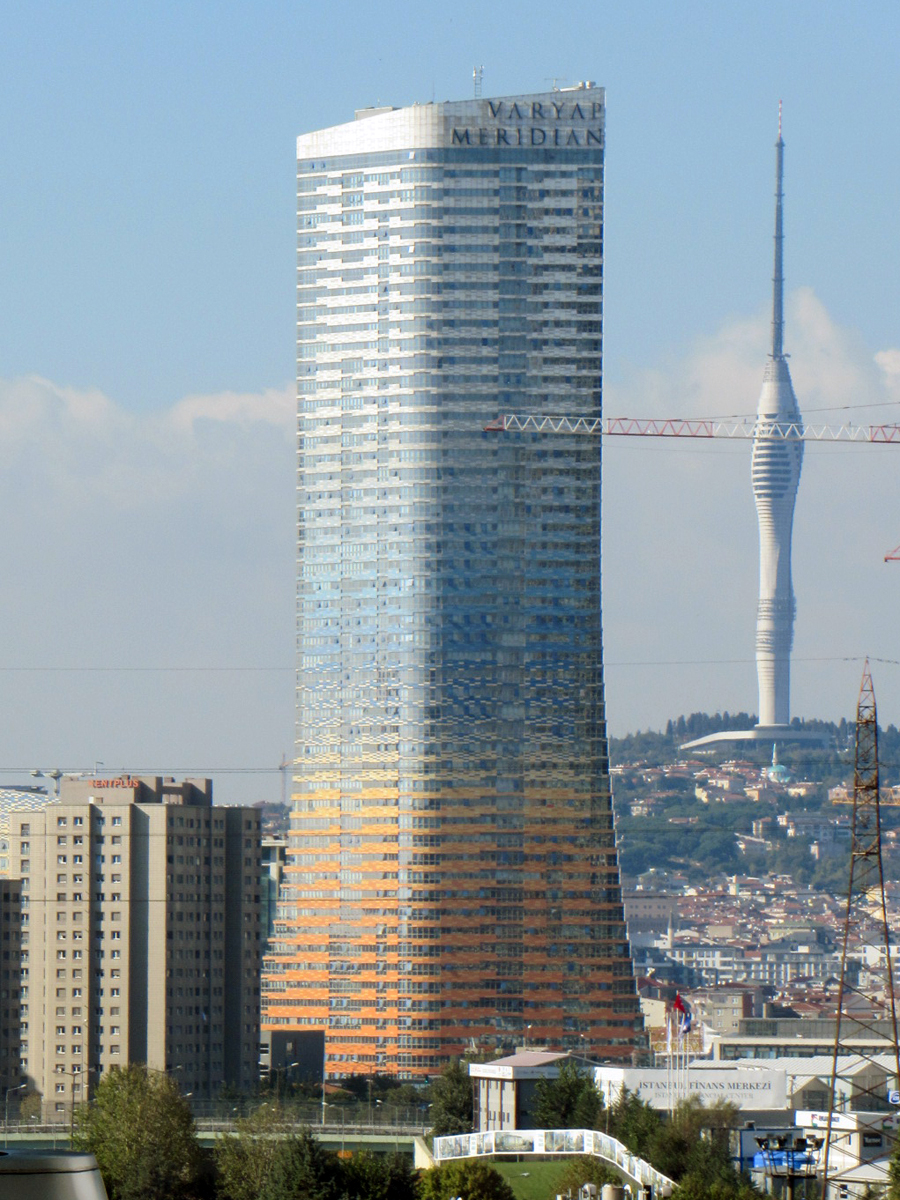
- Interactive map of the Varyap Meridian Grand Tower area

General information
- Status: Completed
- Type: Residential
- Location: Ataşehir, Istanbul, Turkey
- Coordinates: 41°0′3.41″N 29°6′10.63″E
- Opening: Second Quarter 2012
- Cost: US$1,200,000,000 (Whole Varyap Meridian Project)

Height
- Roof: 184 m (604 ft)

Technical details
- Floor count: 54 (above ground) 5 (below ground)

Design and construction
- Architect: RMJM
- Developer: Varyap

Varyap Meridian Project is a mixed-use development located in Istanbul's Ataşehir financial and business district on the Anatolian (Asian) side of the city. Varyap Meridian Block A is the tallest building in this project, at 184 m.

== Location ==
It is set in the Ataşehir district of Istanbul at the crossroads of major highways, subway lines and the Sabiha Gökçen International Airport on the Asian side of the city.

== See also ==
- List of tallest buildings in Istanbul
- List of tallest buildings in Turkey
- List of tallest buildings in the World
