= Appleton Tower =

Coordinates: 55°56′40″N 3°11′14″W

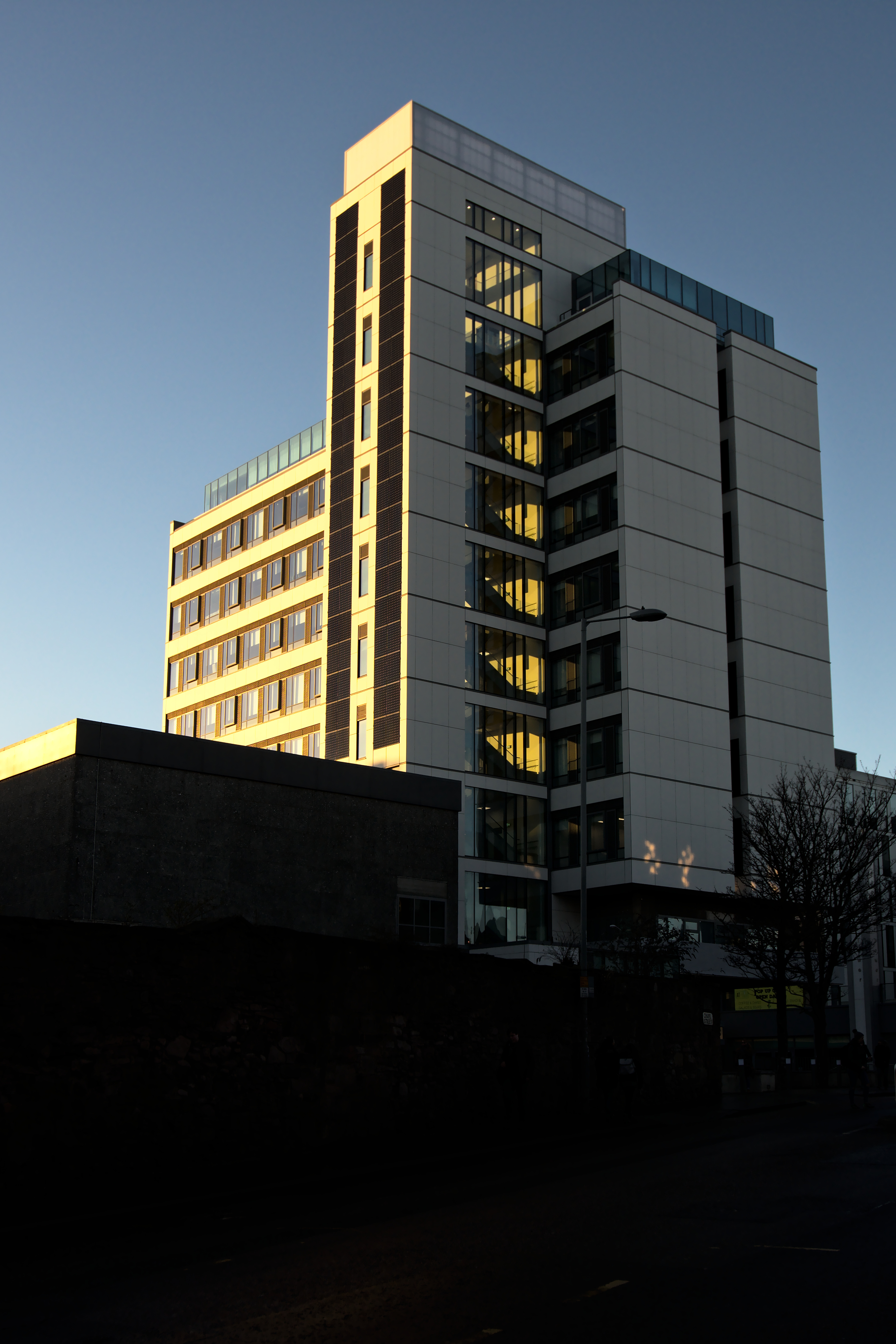
- The tower in 2018, following the completion of extensive recladding works.
- Interactive map of the Appleton Tower area

General information
- Type: University tower block
- Location: Edinburgh, Scotland
- Construction started: 1963
- Completed: 1966
- Owner: The University of Edinburgh

Technical details
- Floor count: 11

Design and construction
- Architects: Alan Reiach, Eric Hall and Partners

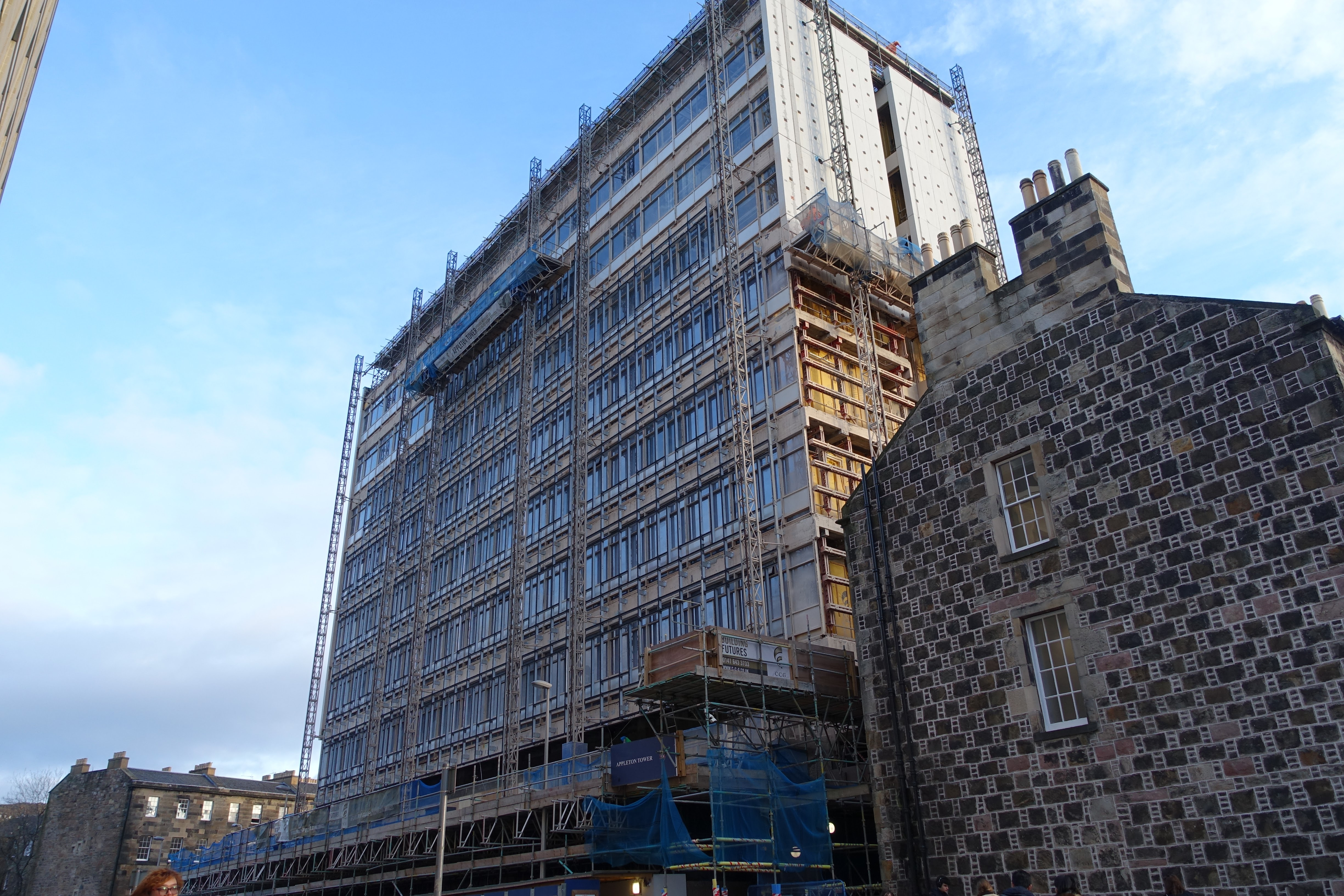
Appleton Tower under renovation in 2016; works to reclad the tower and add another floor. The works were completed in 2017.

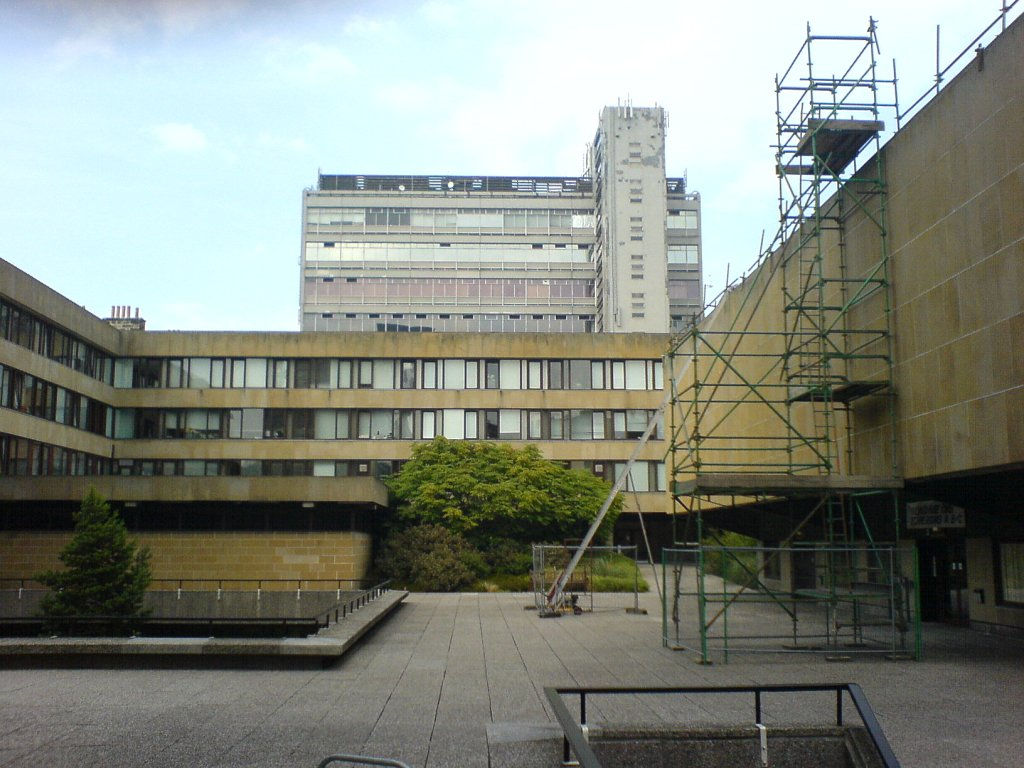
Appleton Tower under renovation, 2006; seen rising above the courtyard (also under repair) of 40 George Square

Appleton Tower is a tower block in Edinburgh, Scotland, owned by the University of Edinburgh.

== History ==
=== Construction ===
When the university developed the George Square area in the 1960s, a large swathe of Georgian Edinburgh was demolished, leading to accusations of cultural vandalism. The Appleton Tower was intended as the first phase of the proposed interlinked Fundamental Science buildings, in a development that would have covered much of the South Side. The Tower was named in posthumous honour of physicist Sir Edward Appleton, the Principal who oversaw the development from vision into concrete reality of the George Square redevelopment.

In the post-war period, vociferous support for the George Square scheme, and impassioned opposition to it, were so intense as to elevate it to a national debate. Although the Fundamental Science Buildings were not completed, preparatory demolition of Bristo Street to form the adjoining Crichton Street site left the university with an embarrassing gap site, which remained as an open, windswept car park for over forty years.

=== Refurbishment ===
Following the Edinburgh Cowgate fire in December 2002, three floors (3-5) of the building were used by the School of Informatics. These were completely refurbished, creating a modern environment for teaching and research. The five lecture theatres and teaching space on the ground and first floors were refurbished in 2006, and the remaining floors (basement and 6-8) were renovated in 2007.

The 2007 completion of the interior renovation of Appleton Tower coincided with further development of the surrounding area. The adjacent Crichton Street Car Park closed in 2005 to allow for the construction of the Informatics Forum. When the building was completed in 2008, it became the new permanent home for the School of Informatics, allowing research to relocate from Appleton Tower.

=== Recladding ===
The Tower's external cladding of pre-cast concrete slabs with mosaic detailing had suffered badly from the Scottish weather, and in 2014 the university received permission for the recladding of the exterior, a reworking of the podium including the creation of a proper entrance, and integrating the Tower with the surrounding environment of Edinburgh's Southside. The refurbishment was completed on 7 November 2017.

=== Edinburgh Festival Fringe ===
Until 2022, the tower was used by the Edinburgh Festival Fringe Society as "Fringe Central" each August during the festival. It acted as a hub for performers and press and was designated as Venue 2. Fringe Central moved to St James Quarter in 2022 and permanently to the Grassmarket in 2025.

== Design ==
Designed by Alan Reiach, Eric Hall and Partners, the building included seven floors of laboratory accommodation, surmounting a double-height circulation concourse, with facilities included in its podium. A block containing five lecture theatres clad in conglomerate concrete and pebble-imbedded slabs is attached to its southern side. The tower's completion in 1966 created a symbolic manifestation of Appleton's vision for integration of the arts and sciences, with the twin towers of David Hume (Arts, now called 40 George Square) and Appleton (Sciences), dominating the University's Central area.

An associated teaching block for east George Square, and a Mathematics and Physics building for the "car park site" on north Crichton Street, were intended to interlock at this sector. The latter project was relocated to King's Buildings in the 1960s, resulting in the James Clerk Maxwell Building; the succeeding project for the site, the dental hospital and school, was abandoned for lack of funding. The Tower was left isolated - and without a proper entrance, as this had been intended to be via connection to further construction.

Appleton Tower was built to allow first-year science students to be taught in the university's Central area. It has five lecture theatres, together accommodating around 1,200 students, and several smaller seminar and tutorial rooms. The upper floors originally housed teaching laboratories, which, with the development of more modern facilities at King's Buildings, had become outdated by the end of the 20th century. The upper floors are now used by the School of Informatics for free access study space, office space, and small teaching rooms.

== Criticism ==
The building has been repeatedly criticised for its outward appearance. Geneticist Steve Jones described "the ugliness of the Appleton Tower" as one of the wonders of the world for a BBC2 TV show.

Early in 2005, a student newspaper launched a campaign to nominate it for the Channel 4 series Demolition – a series about the "worst buildings in Britain". The Tower did not make the final twelve. Later in the same year, Historic Scotland considered giving the building listed status, but after opposition it was removed from the list.

A common joke among students and staff of the University of Edinburgh is that Appleton Tower has some of the best views in Edinburgh, because it is one of the few places in the centre of the city where you cannot see the tower itself.
