= New Club =

Social club in Edinburgh, Scotland

Coordinates: 55°57′07″N 3°11′52″W

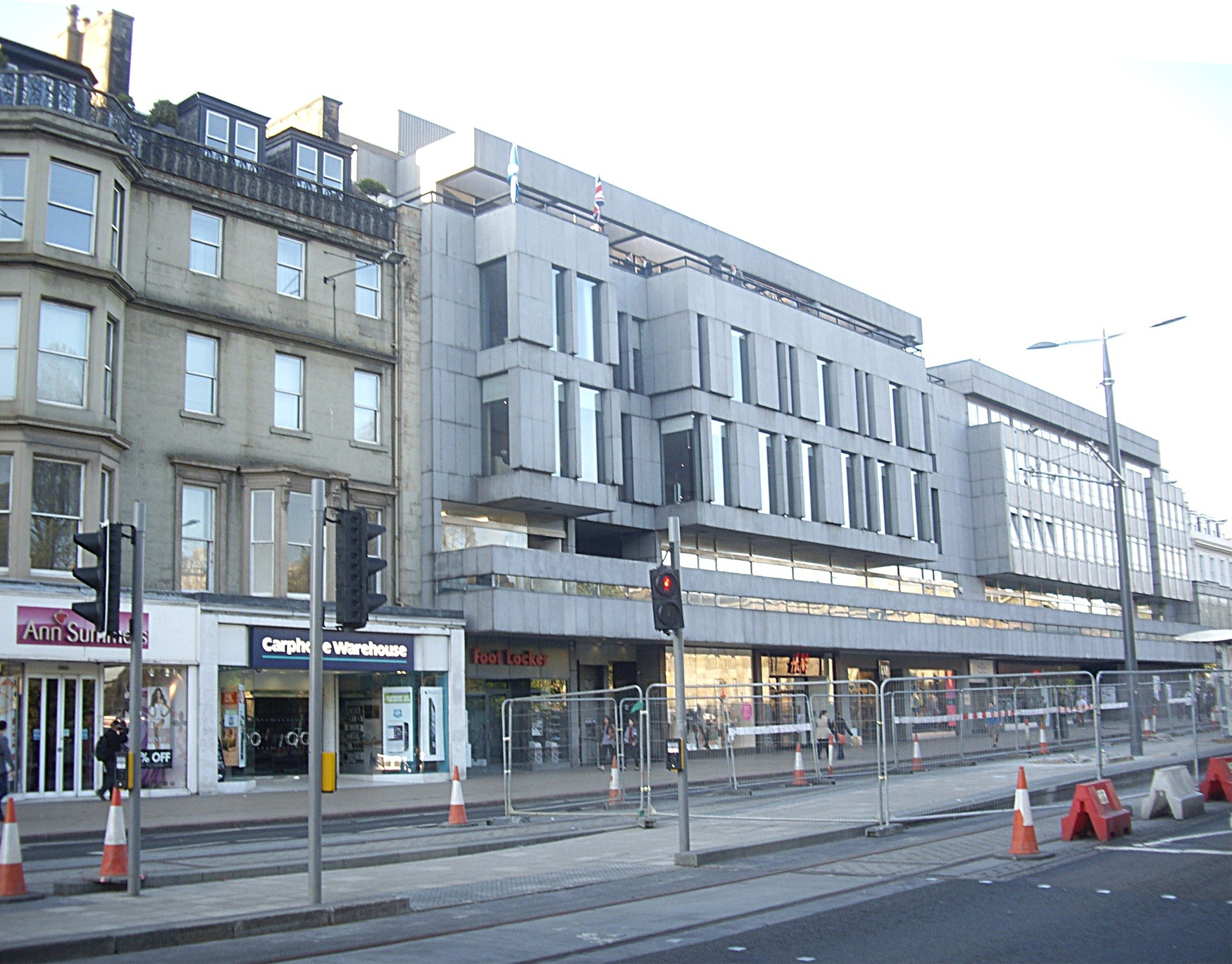
The New Club building on Princes Street

The New Club is a private social club in the New Town area of Edinburgh, Scotland. Founded in 1787, it is Scotland's oldest club. The club occupied premises on St Andrew Square from 1809 until 1837, when it moved to purpose-built rooms on Princes Street. The 1837 building was replaced with a modern building to a design by Reiach and Hall, which is protected as a category A listed building. Women were admitted in 1970, and offered full membership from 2010.

== History ==
The New Club was founded on 1 February 1787, three weeks after the idea had been conceived at a Caledonian Hunt Ball held at the New Assembly Rooms in George Street. The club was originally located in Bayle’s Tavern on Shakespeare Square, at the east end of Princes Street, which was demolished in the early 1800s. After the death of Jean Bayle in 1802, some thought was given to taking over the tavern, but the purchase of a property in St Andrew Square was the preferred course of action. Having abandoned the tavern in Shakespeare Square, the club was now obliged to find temporary quarters in Fortune’s Tontine Tavern at 5 Princes Street before finding a new home, in August 1809, at 3 St Andrew Square.

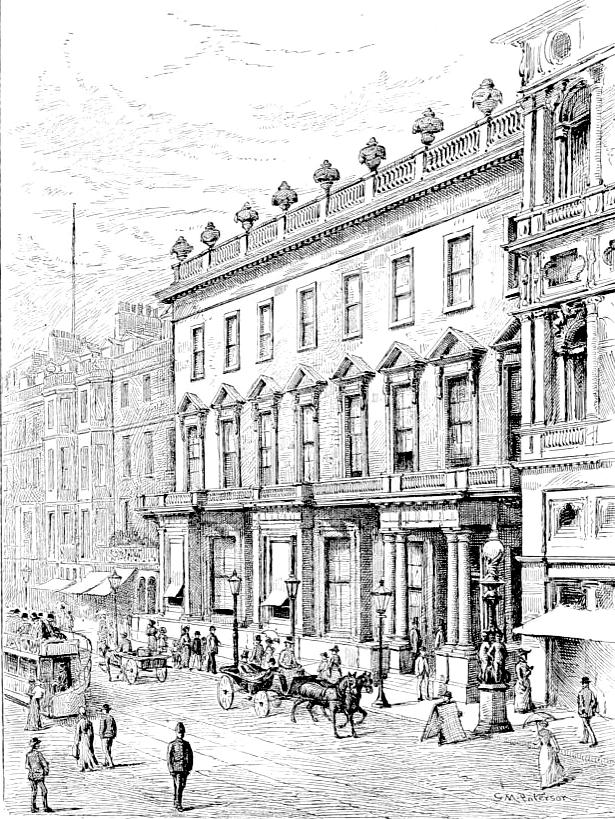
The original New Club building on Princes Street, designed by David Bryce

Subsequently, numbers 84 and 85 Princes Street were purchased, redesigned and rebuilt, to a design by William Burn, as a clubhouse into which the club moved on 15 May 1837. It was the first new building in Princes Street requiring the demolition of the original houses of the James Craig designed New Town. It was enlarged in 1859 to a design by David Bryce. Over the years various changes were made to the internal design of the club, perhaps the major one being the reconstruction of the Coffee Room, or Dining Room, in 1908–1912. It had been decided to increase its size and improve the lighting. Sir Robert Lorimer drew up a scheme to extend the Room by 9 feet (2.7 m), with new windows being inserted and the walls adorned by oak panelling with inset portraits.

Prince Philip, Duke of Edinburgh became the Patron of the Club in 1952 and held that position until his death in 2021; in 2012 a large window was installed in the entrance to the Club to mark his sixtieth anniversary as patron and the Queen's Diamond Jubillee. In 1953 the New and University Clubs amalgamated. Whilst extensive alterations and redecoration were carried out, there remained unresolved the intention to create a ladies’ annexe. The club was completely rebuilt in the 1960s to a modern design by Alan Reiach, Eric Hall and Partners, incorporating the recommendations of the Princes Street Panel which included the aspiration for a continuous first-floor walkway along Princes Street. The new building introduced a Ladies’ "Side" with a Ladies' Bar, Ladies’ Drawing Room and Ladies’ Dining Room. The cost of demolition and re-build was paid for by an insurance company who gained 125 year leases on the three shops below the club's main floors. The club negotiated a lease of the St Andrew’s Hotel as a temporary clubhouse whilst the Princes Street building was demolished and rebuilt. On re-building, the club re-constructed the original Lorimer panelling within the new Dining Room. The new clubhouse opened for lunch on Monday 15 December 1969.

Ladies were first admitted as Associate Members to the club on 25 March 1970 (Lady Day). Only wives of Members could be elected until October 2010, when ladies were permitted full membership and their husbands could join as Associate Members.

== The New Club building ==
Numbers 84–87 Princes Street, incorporating the New Club, were listed by Historic Scotland on 18 March 1996 as a category A listed building. Category A includes buildings which are of national or international architectural significance. Historic Scotland describe the New Club premises as the finest example of a Princes Street Panel building. The Princes Street façade, faced with plate glass and Rubislaw granite and with distinctive cantilevered sections, is described as "very carefully composed". The building is one of around 60 post-Second World War listed buildings in Edinburgh.

== See also ==
- DoCoMoMo Key Scottish Monuments
- List of Category A listed buildings in the New Town, Edinburgh
- List of post-war Category A listed buildings in Scotland
- Prospect 100 best modern Scottish buildings

== Bibliography ==
- McCrae, Morrice, ed. (2004). The New Club - A History. Tuckwell Press.
