= Stirrat Johnson-Marshall =

British architect (1921 - 1981)

Sir Stirrat Johnson-Marshall CBE ARIBA FRIBA
- Born: Stirrat Andrew William Johnson-Marshall; 19 February 1912; Ajmer, India
- Died: 16 December 1981 (aged 69); Bristol, United Kingdom
- Education: Queen Elizabeth School; University of Liverpool
- Spouse: Joan Mary Brighouse (m. 1937)
- Children: 3
- Relatives: Percy Johnson-Marshall (brother)

Sir Stirrat Andrew William Johnson-Marshall, CBE ARIBA FRIBA (19 February 1912 – 16 December 1981) was a British architect and one of the founders of RMJM along with Robert Matthew.

== Early life and studies ==
Stirrat Johnson-Marshall was born in 1912 in Ajmer, India. He was the son of Felix William Norman Johnson-Marshall, a civil servant who worked abroad and his wife, Kate Jane Little. He was educated at the Queen Elizabeth School in Kirkby Lonsdale and from 1930-1935 he studied architecture at the University of Liverpool.

== Career ==
In 1934 he worked as an assistant at Mercalf & Metcalf and the following year he assisted the Borough of Willsden, Architect's Department. During the Second World War, he served with the Royal Engineers in Singapore. After the war he worked as Deputy County Architect in Hertfordshire County Council. In 1948, he became Chief Architect in the Ministry of Education.

In 1956, with fellow architect Robert Matthew, he established the firm of RMJM (Robert Matthew, Johnson Marshall) in Edinburgh and London. Johnson-Marshall managed the office in London. He retired from the firm in 1978 and moved to Gloucestershire.

He died on 16 December 1981 in his Bristol office.

== Personal life ==
In 1937, he married Joan Mary Brighouse, whom he had met at the University of Liverpool. They had three children. His younger brother Percy Johnson-Marshall was a British urban designer.

== Honours ==
In 1936, he was elected ARIBA, his proposers being Lionel Bailey Budden, Leonard Holcombe Bucknell and Gilbert Henry Lovegrove.

In 1954, he was awarded a CBE. In 1964, he was elected FRIBA, his proposers being Robert Matthew, Peter Arthur Newnham and Maurice William Lee. In 1971, he was knighted.
