= DHA City Karachi =

DHA City Karachi شهر ڈی ایچ اے کراچی
- Housing estate
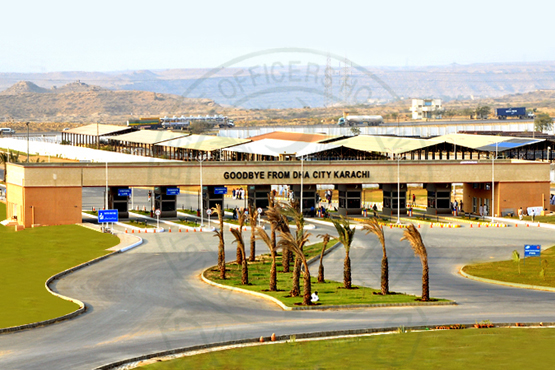
- Interactive map of DHA City Karachi
- Coordinates: 25.0380°N 67.4488°E
- Country: Pakistan
- Province: Sindh
- Division: Karachi
- District: Malir

Area (as planned)
  - Total: 47 km^{2} (18 sq mi)
- Elevation: 8 m (26 ft)

DHA City Karachi (DCK) is a housing estate being built in Gadap Town, which is being developed by Defence Housing Authority and is located in the outskirts of Karachi, Sindh, Pakistan. The project spans 4,710 hectares (11,600 acres).
