= RMJM =

Scottish architectural and design firm

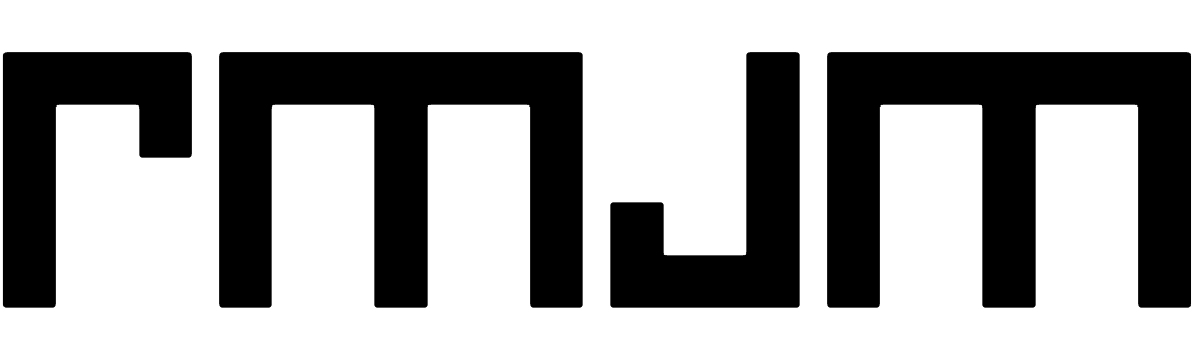
- Industry: Architecture, design
- Founded: Edinburgh, Scotland (1956)
- Founders: Robert Matthew & Stirrat Johnson-Marshall
- Area served: International
- Services: Architecture; Engineering; Interior design; Landscape design; Master planning; Product design; Urban design; Project management; Healthcare design; Sport facility design; Facade design; Airport design; 3D modelling; Development management; Lead consultancy
- Website: www.rmjm.com

RMJM (Robert Matthew Johnson Marshall) is one of the largest architecture and design networks in the world. Services include architecture, development management, engineering, interior design, landscape design, lead consultancy, master planning, product design, specialist advisory services, and urban design. The network caters to a wide range of clients in multiple different sectors including mixed-use, education, healthcare, energy, residential, government and hospitality. Specific services are also available through global PRO studios: RMJM Sport, RMJM Healthcare, RMJM DX and RMJM PIM.

Founded in 1956 by architects Robert Matthew and Stirrat Johnson-Marshall, RMJM's first offices were based in London and Edinburgh. RMJM has been a strong proponent of modern and contemporary architecture inspired by cultures around the globe since its conception.

== History ==
RMJM was founded by Stirrat Johnson-Marshall and Robert Matthew in 1956. The partnership began following Robert Matthew's decision to hire Johnson-Marshall to manage the new London office of his architecture practice, which had been set up to oversee the construction of New Zealand House in Haymarket Road, London, described as "London's most distinguished 1960s office block". The firm was heavily involved with academic campus projects in Scotland in the early 1960s, with notable commissions for the University of Edinburgh, the new University of Strathclyde in 1964 and the University of Stirling.

In 1961, the firm took Tom Spaven, Kenneth Graham, Vernon Lee, John Richards, Chris Carter, and Alan Whiteman into partnership. As a result, the practice changed its name to RMJM & Partners. The change in name also marked a shift towards larger international projects; by 1967 the practice employed 350 members of staff between the Edinburgh and London offices.

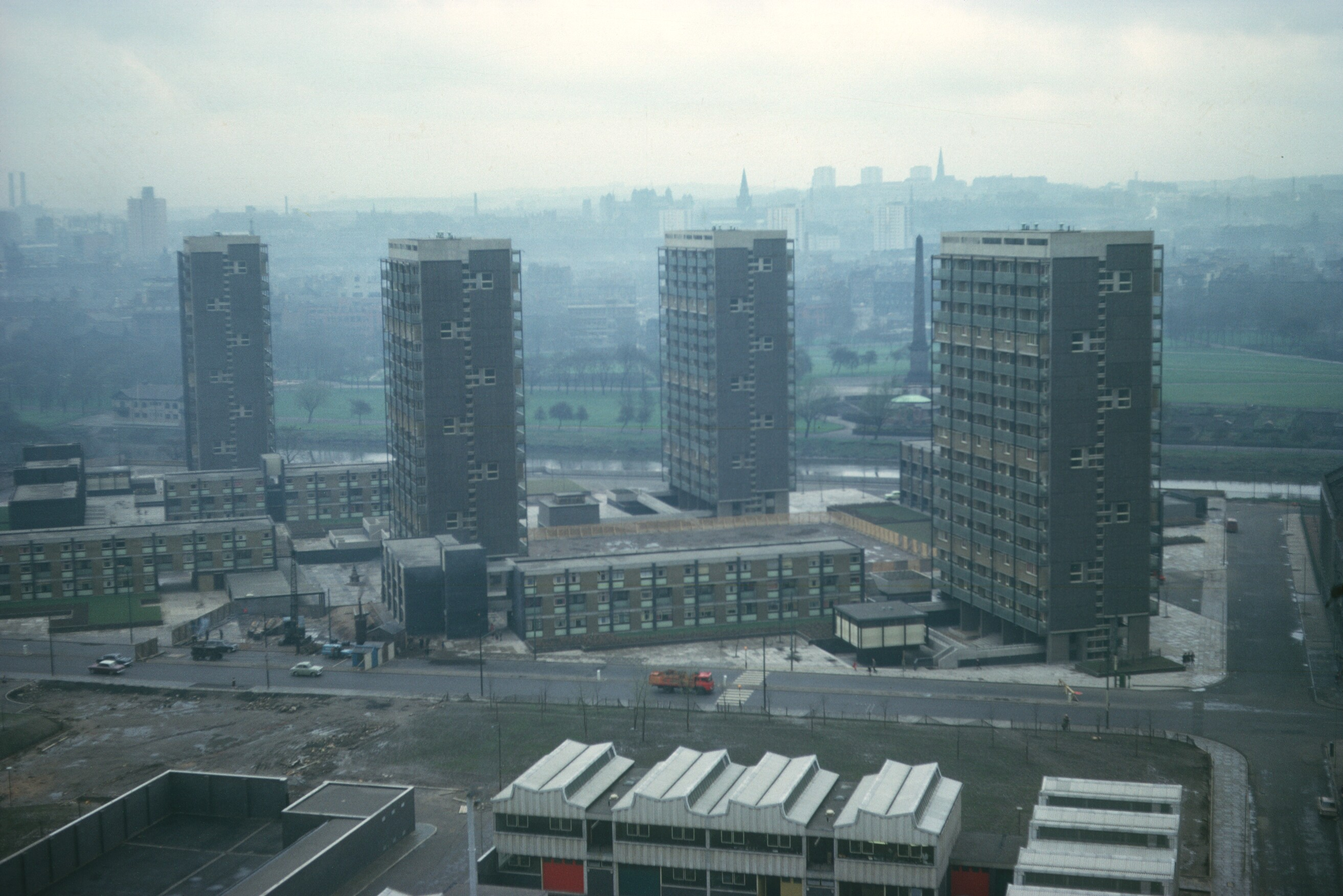
The Hutchesontown "B" estate, Gorbals, Glasgow (1960–64) was one of the firm's earliest commissions

RMJM began to take on more projects as the need for public sector construction grew, expanding to include a Glasgow studio before extending its reach beyond the British borders. In the late 1960s, the firm began working on projects in the United States. Further projects in the Middle East and Central Asia saw RMJM establish several more international studios in the following decades.

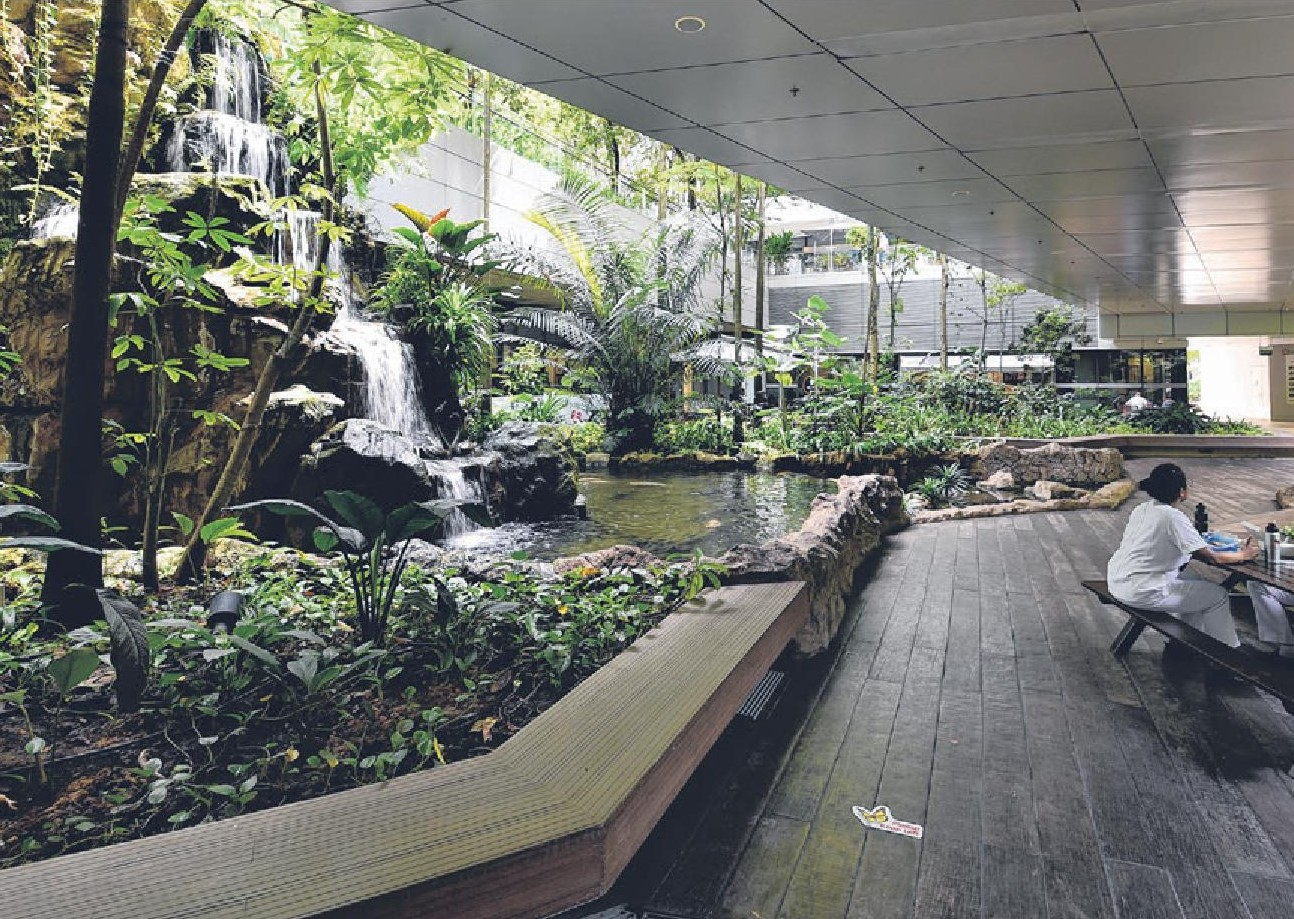
Indoor Garden, Khoo Teck Puat Hospital, SIngapore

Over the next 20 years, RMJM continued to expand and the firms modernist, functional style became a trademark. As RMJM moved further into the emerging markets of the Middle East, East Asia, and Africa, it began to establish more offices within the respective countries.

In 2009, RMJM designed the multiple award-winning S$700 million (2023) (US$521.31 million) Khoo Teck Puat Hospital in Singapore, its first major foray into South East Asia.

Around 2010, management difficulties meant the RMJM workforce shrunk while they were subject to lawsuits and other challenges with their international studios Between 2011 and 2019, the company saw a change in its fortunes as it began to expand its services once more. 2014 saw the firm renew their relationship with the Commonwealth Games by taking on the role of masterplanners for the City Legacy Consortium, developing 700 homes in the City of Glasgow's Commonwealth Athletes Village.

In 2016, RMJM announced the creation of its first "PRO" studios with the capacity to provide sector-specific services, known as RMJM Sport and RMJM Healthcare. In the last decade RMJM has been commissioned for a number of significant projects including The Lakhta Center, the Gate to the East, Iran Historical Car Museum, Evolution Tower and Sheremetyevo Airport's North Terminal Complex.

== Locations ==
Africa: Nairobi, Kenya; Mombasa, Kenya; Kampala, Uganda; Dar es Salaam, Tanzania; Gaborone, Botswana; Pretoria, South Africa

Americas: New York City, USA; Sao Paulo, Brazil; Curitiba, Brazil

Asia: Karachi, Pakistan; Shanghai, PRC; Shenzhen, PRC; Hong Kong; Singapore

Europe: Valletta, Malta; Rome, Milan, Italy; Ostrava, Czech Rupublic; Belgrade, Serbia; Istanbul, Turkey

Middle East: Dubai, UAE; Tehran, Iran

Sector Specific: Sport; Healthcare; PIM; DX

== Notable projects ==
- Royal Commonwealth Pool, Edinburgh, Scotland
- Hutchesontown Area B housing estate, Gorbals, Glasgow, Scotland
- Falkirk Wheel, Falkirk, Scotland
- University of Strathclyde campus masterplan, Glasgow, Scotland
- Colville Building, University of Strathclyde, Glasgow, Scotland
- Islamabad Masterplan, Islamabad, Pakistan
- New Zealand House, London, England
- Holy Area Development Project, Mecca, Kingdom of Saudi Arabia
- Scottish National Gallery of Modern Art, Edinburgh, Scotland
- Scottish Parliament, Edinburgh, Scotland
- Khoo Teck Puat Hospital, Singapore
- China National Convention Centre, Beijing, China
- Abu Dhabi National Exhibition Centre, Abu Dhabi, UAE
- Varyap Meridian, Istanbul, Turkey
- Commonwealth Games Athlete's Village, Glasgow, Scotland
- DHA City, Karachi, Pakistan
- Sheremetyevo International Airport North Terminal Complex, Moscow, Russia
- Evolution Tower, Moscow, Russia
- Gate to the East, Suzhou, China
- Lakhta Center, Saint-Petersburg, Russia
- Zhuhai Tower, Zhuhai, China
- Capital Gate, Abu Dhabi, UAE
- Gate Avenue, Dubai, UAE
- Metropol Istanbul, Istanbul, Turkey
- Shenzhen Metro Line 6, Shenzhen, China
- Dubai International Convention and Exhibition Centre, Dubai, UAE
- China Merchants Bank Tower, Shanghai, China
- Belgrade Waterfront, Belgrade, Serbia

== Awards ==
- Financial Times Industrial Architecture Award, 1968, Power Station, Cockenzie
- Civic Trust Award, 1968, Pathfoot Building, University of Stirling
- RIBA Regional Award, 1970, Royal Commonwealth Pool, Edinburgh
- Saltire Award, 1970, Housing at Scotstoun Park, South Queensferry
- Civic Trust European Architecture Heritage Year Award, 1975, RMJM Offices, Edinburgh
- American Institute of Architects Awards, 1983, New Jersey Highway Authority Office Complex, New Jersey
- Queens Award for Export Achievement, 1983
- RSA Gold Medal for Architecture, 1994
- Dynamic Place Award- Supreme Award, 2003, Falkirk Wheel Boatlift, Falkirk
- RIBA Stirling Prize, 2005, The Scottish Parliament, Edinburgh
- Construction Week's "Project of the Year" Award, 2008, Abu Dhabi National Exhibition Centre, Abu Dhabi
- AIA Hong Kong Awards 'Merit Award for Architecture', 2009, Evian Town, Hong Kong
- Futurarc Green Leadership Awards, 2011, Khoo Teck Puat Hospital, Singapore
- Green Excellency Award, Pakistan Green Building Council, 2016, DHA City Karachi, Pakistan
- International Airport Review Awards Finalist, 2018, Sheremetyevo Airport Terminal B, Moscow
- 2020 CTBUH Awards of Excellence for "Best Tall Building 400 Meters and Above", 2019, Lakhta Center, St Petersburg
- Construction Week Awards- Construction Executive of the Year Finalist, 2019

== Gallery ==
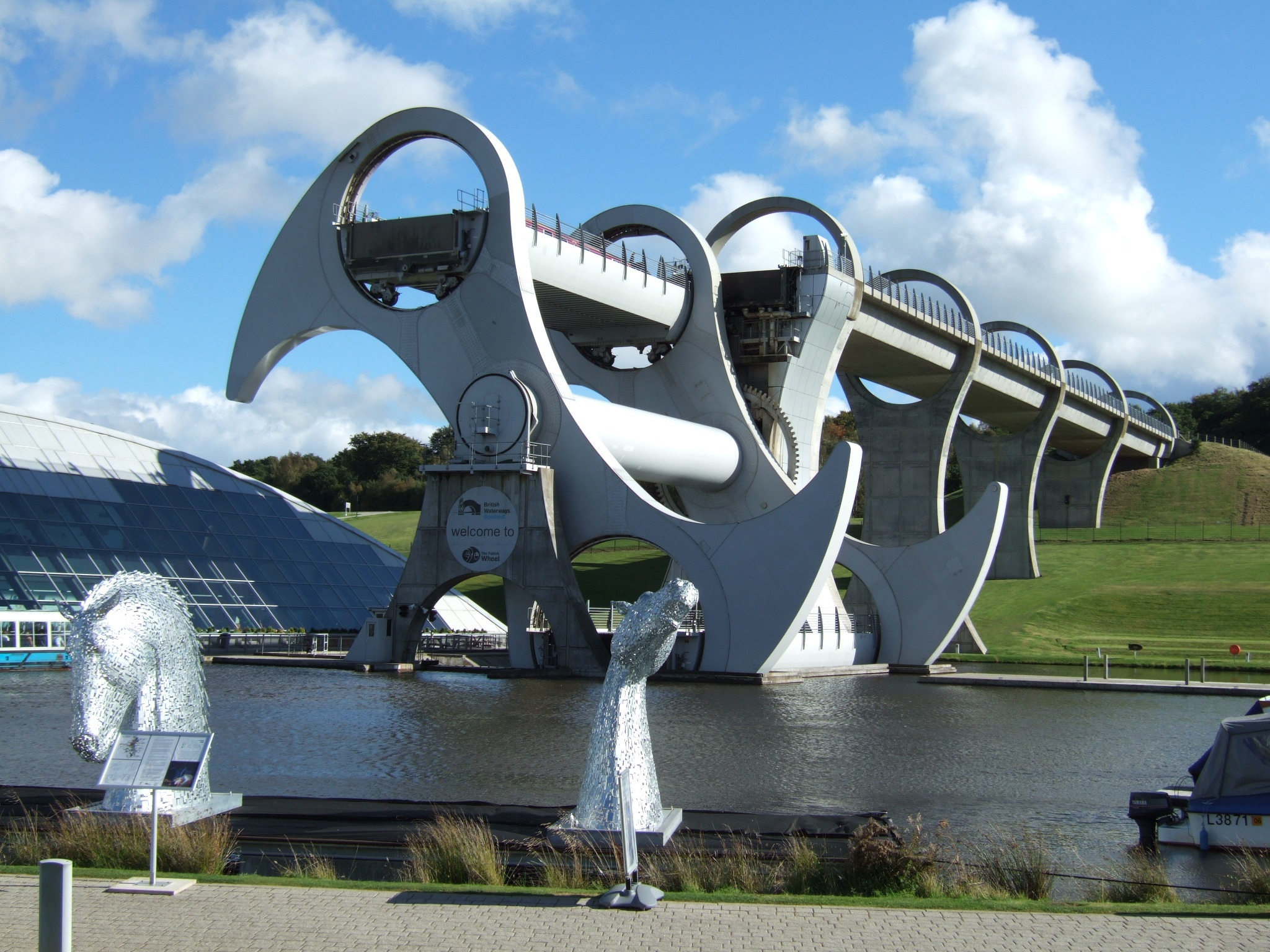
The Falkirk Wheel, Scotland

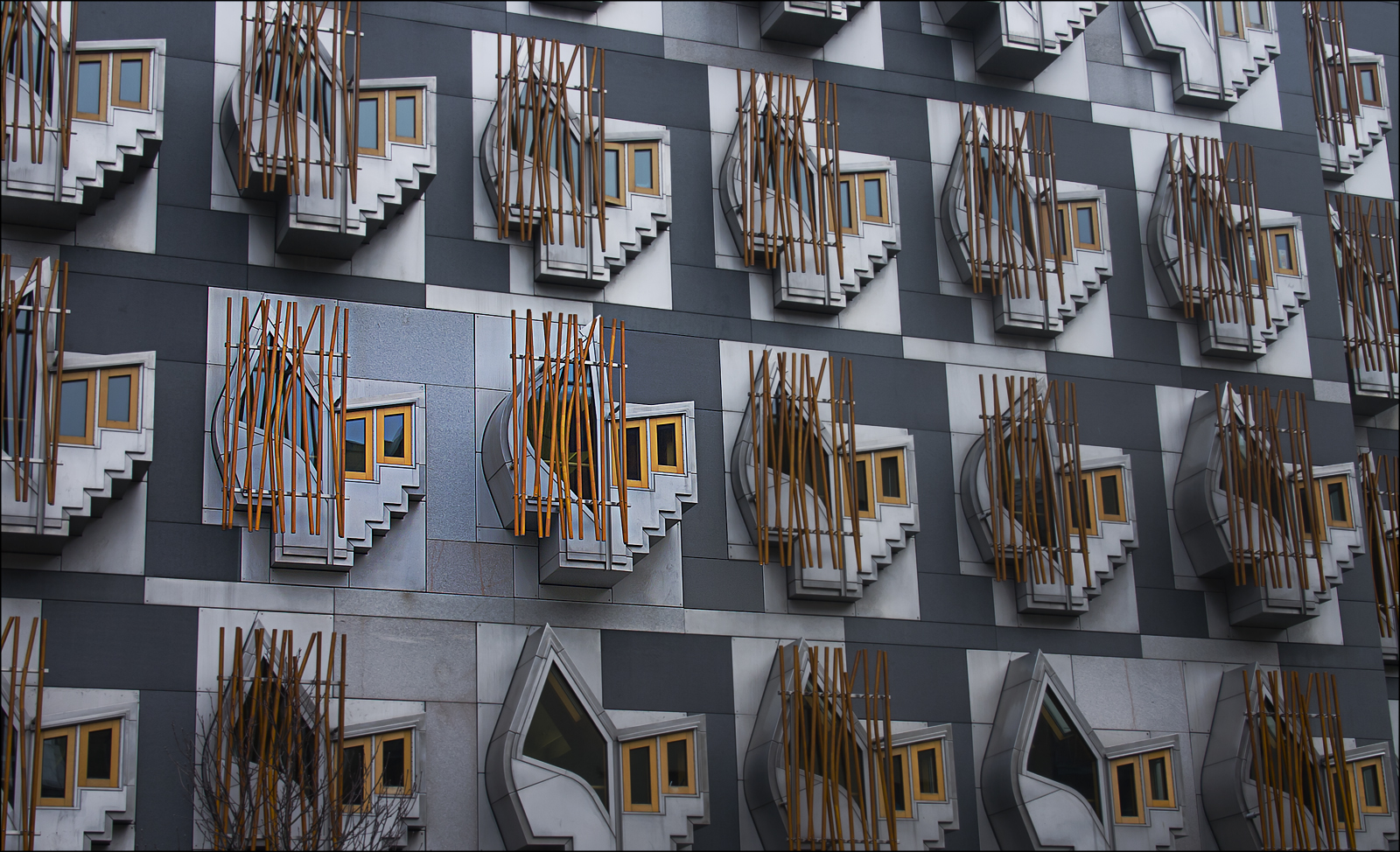
Scottish Parliament Building, Scotland

Capital Gate, Abu Dhabi

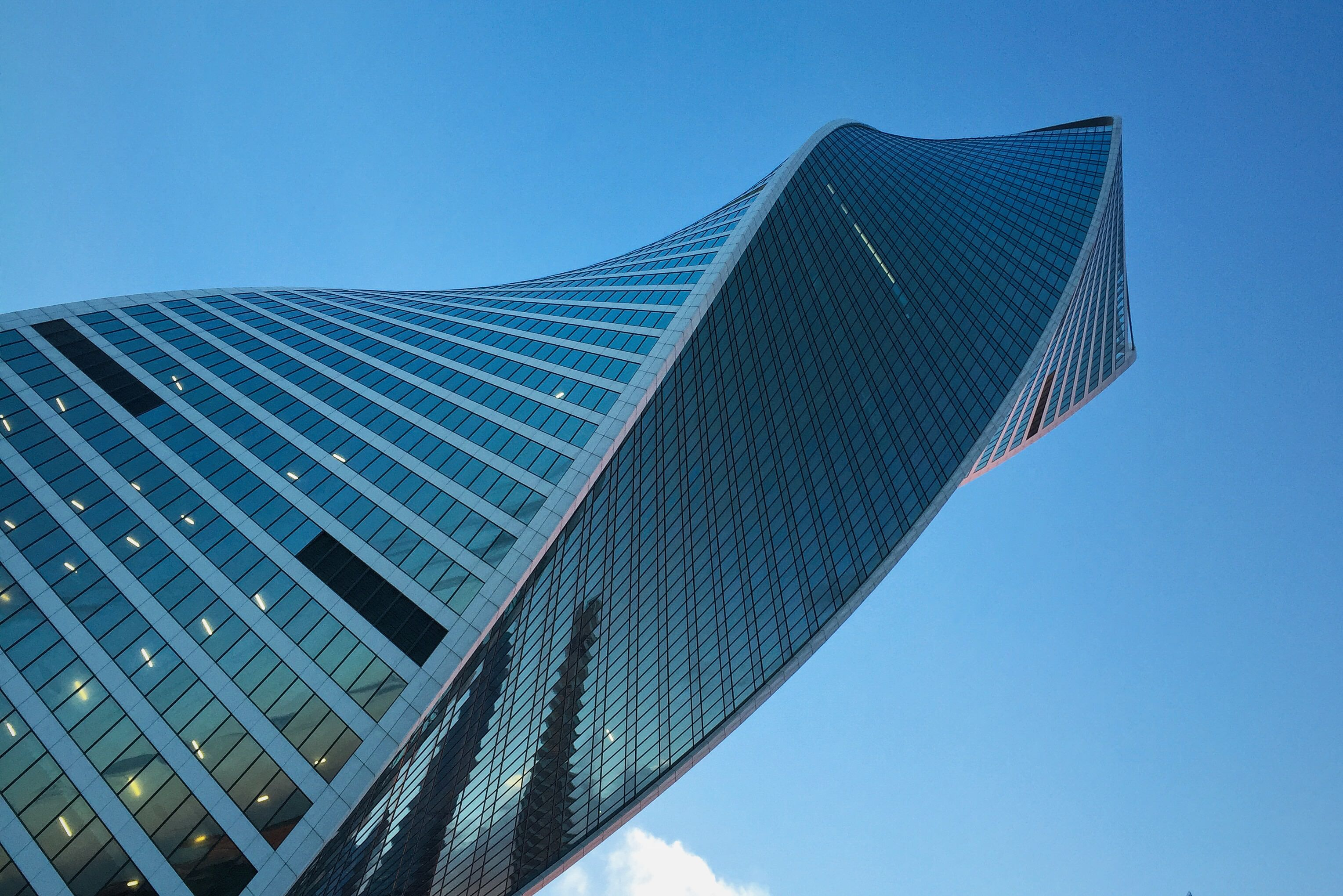
Evolution Tower, Moscow

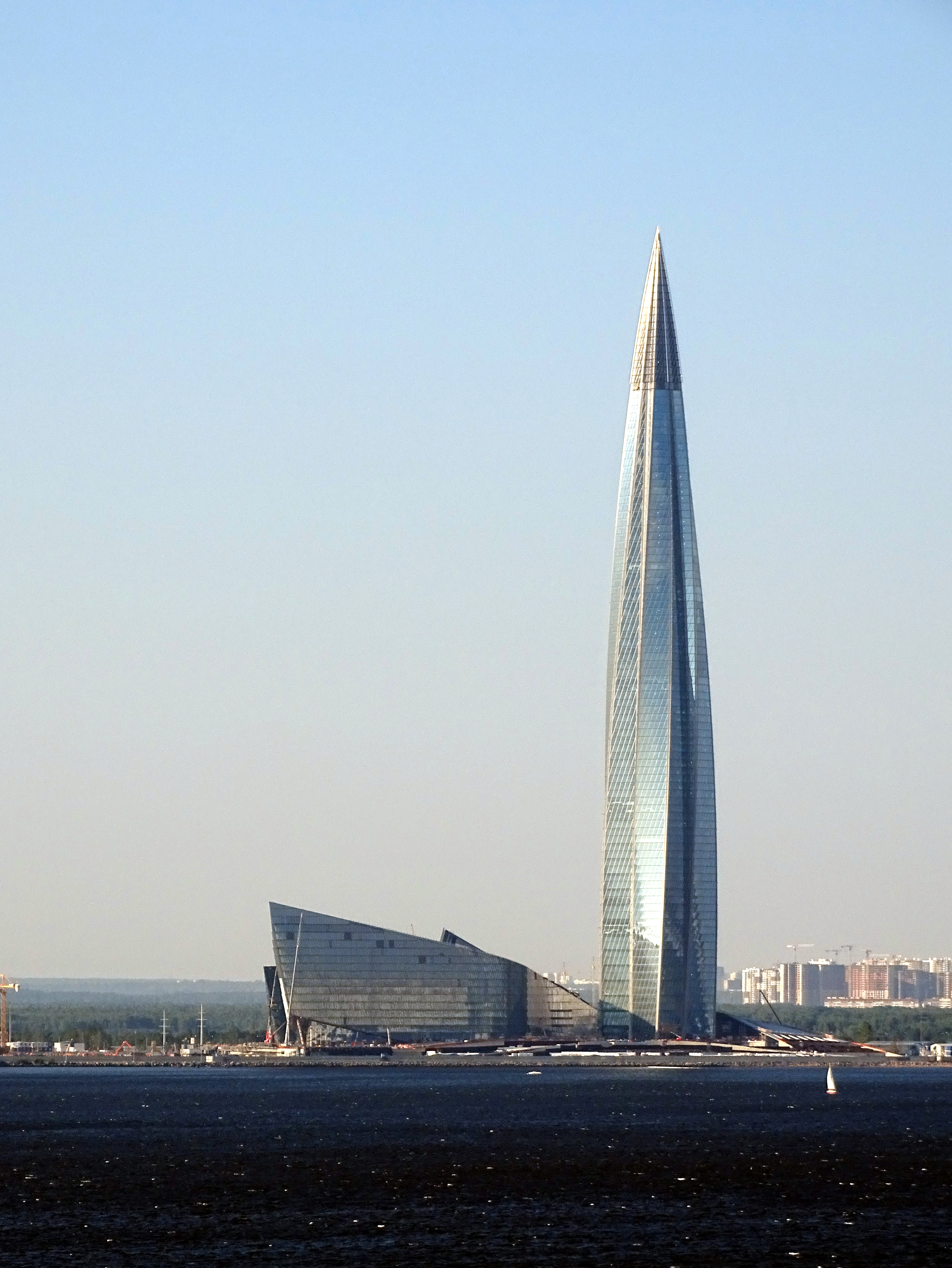
Lakhta Center, St-Petersburg

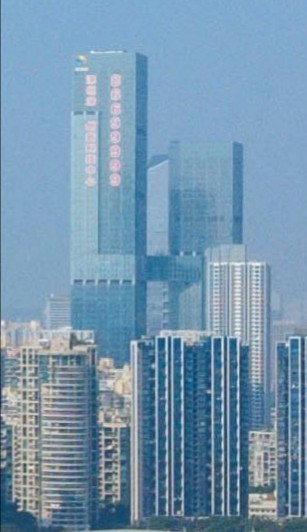
Shenzhen Bay Innovation and Technology Centre, Shenzhen

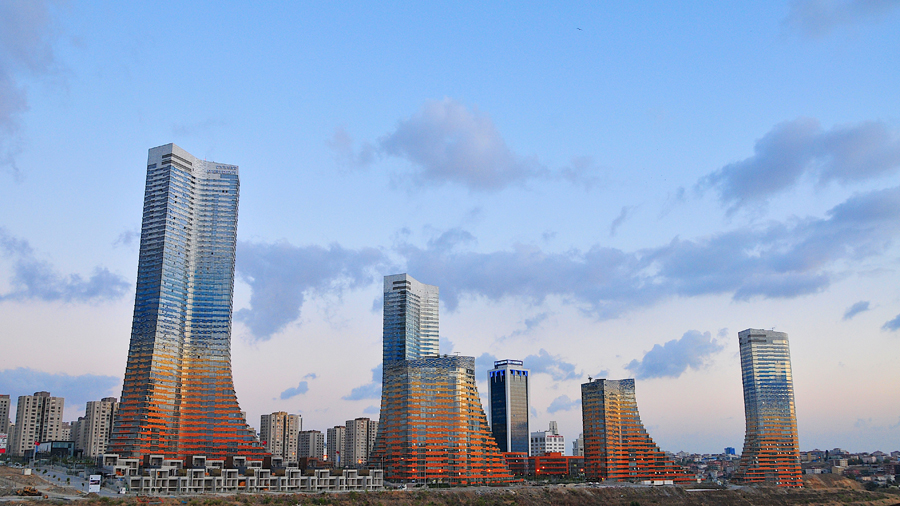
Varyap Meridian, Istanbul
