= Alan Reiach =

Scottish architect (1910–1992)

- Born: 3 February 1910; London
- Died: 23 July 1992 (aged 82); Edinburgh , Scotland, UK
- Education: Edinburgh College of Art
- Occupation: Architect
- Practice: Alan Reiach, Eric Hall & Partners
- Buildings: New Club, Edinburgh; Appleton Tower

Alan Reiach, FRIBA OBE RSA FRIAS (3 February 1910 – 23 July 1992) was an architect that studied in Edinburgh, primarily worked in Scotland, and a proponent of Scandinavian Modernism.

== Early life and studies ==
Alan Reiach was born in London, the son of Herbert L. Reiach the founding editor of Yachting Monthly who was from Edinburgh. Alan moved to Edinburgh with his aunt in 1922, was educated at Edinburgh Academy and attended the Edinburgh College of Art where he studied under John Begg while articled to Lorimer & Matthew. Upon graduating he received a travelling scholarship and visited France, Scandinavia, the USA and the USSR. The photographic collection from this tour, and later travels, is held by the University of St Andrews.

== Career ==
Reiach took up a Research and Teaching Fellowship at the Edinburgh College of Art in 1938 and, during the Second World War, he worked with fellow architect Robert Hurd on a book for the Saltire Society entitled Building Scotland – Past and Future, a pictorial appeal for post-war Scotland to be planned and designed bravely.

In 1948 he partnered his colleague Ralph Cowan to design the Department of Agriculture at the University of Edinburgh's King's Buildings, now home to the SRUC. Resigning from his teaching post in 1957 he ran Alan Reiach & Partners until 1965 when he formed the practice Alan Reiach, Eric Hall & Partners. He retired from the practice in 1975, but remained a consultant until 1980.

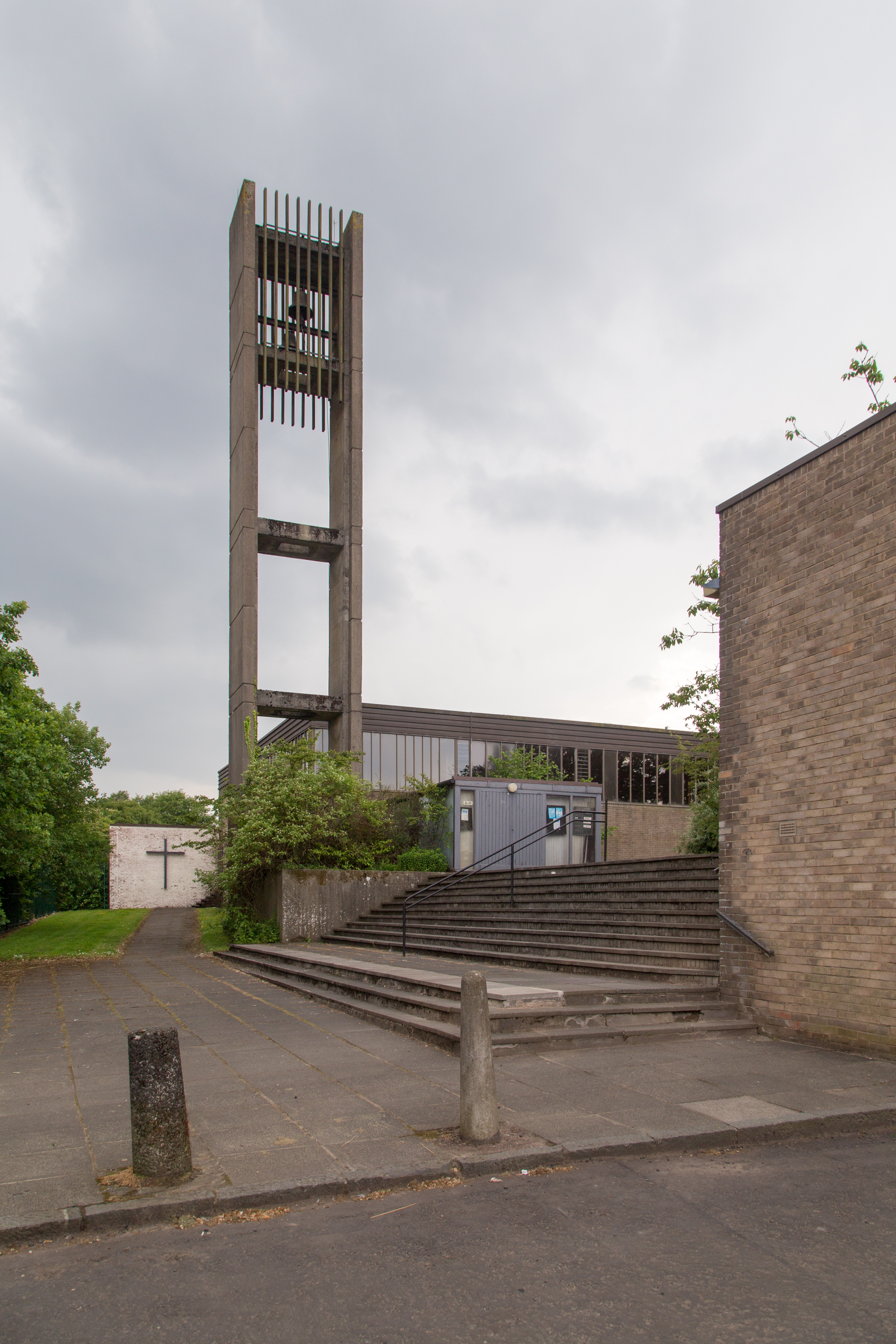
Kildrum Parish Church (31780183118)

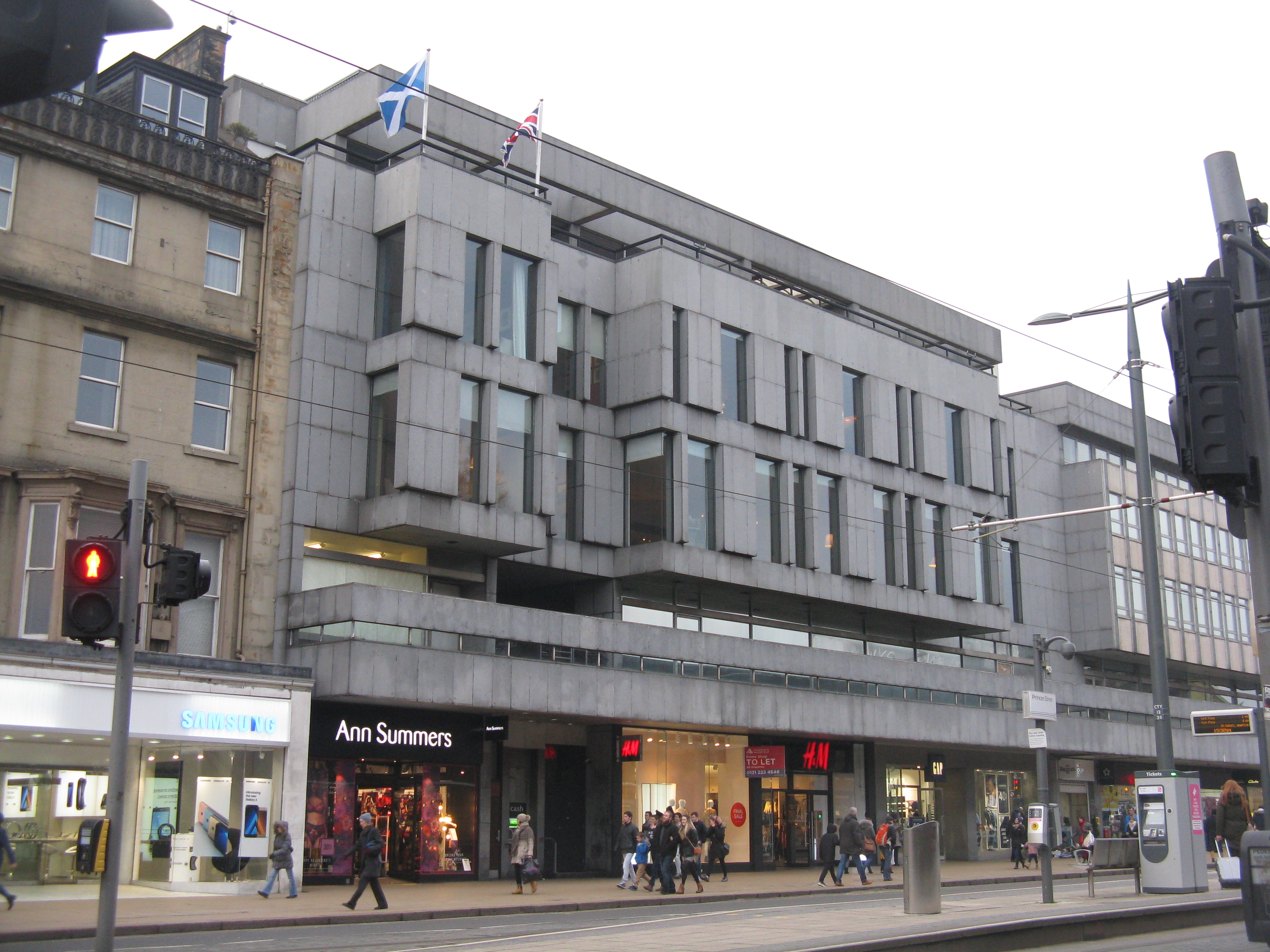
The New Club, Princes Street

Reiach received an OBE in 1964, was a member of the Royal Fine Art Commission for Scotland (1966–1980), on the council of the Cockburn Association (1967–1976), and the Royal Scottish Academy (Associate Member from 1969, Academician from 1986).

Alan Reiach's papers are held by Historic Environment Scotland, covering the period 1930–1976.

== Notable works ==
- Kildrum Parish Church, Cumbernauld 1955–1966
- Appleton Tower, Edinburgh, 1962–1972
- 1 and 3 Winton Loan, Edinburgh, 1962–1964
- St Mungo's Church, Cumbernauld, 1963–1964 destroyed by fire 2 August 2025
- Silverknowes Golf Club & Sports Pavilion, Edinburgh. 1964
- Housing at Crewe Road North, Edinburgh, 1964–1967
- The New Club, Edinburgh, 1967–1969
- The Royal Dick Vet School of Veterinary Studies, Edinburgh, 1969–1971 (now Summerhall)
