= Robert McIntyre =

Robert McIntyre may refer to:

- Robert McIntyre (politician) (1913–1998), Scottish politician
- Robert McIntyre (Paralympian) (1952/53–1995), Australian Paralympic athlete
- Robert McIntyre (bishop) (1851–1914), Scottish-born American clergyman
- Rob McIntyre (born 1956), Australian alpine skier
- Robert G. McIntyre (1931–1995), American politician from Missouri
- Bob McIntyre (motorcyclist) (1928–1962), Scottish motorcycle racer
- Bob McIntyre (soccer) (1904–1998), Scottish-American soccer center forward
- Bob McIntyre (basketball) (born 1944), American basketball player

== See also ==
- Robert Macintyre (1940–1997), Scottish architect
- Robert MacIntyre (born 1996), Scottish golfer
