= The Artist's Cottage project =

Three architectural designs by Charles Rennie Mackintosh

General information
- Type: domestic - An Artist's Cottage and Studio, A Town House for an Artist, Gate Lodge Auchinbothie
- Architectural style: Scottish Art Nouveau from speculative drawings by Charles Rennie Mackintosh, 1901
- Location: Farr by Inverness, Scotland
- Completed: 1992 and 1995

Design and construction
- Architect: Robert Hamilton Macintyre
- Main contractor: Peter Tovell

The Artist's Cottage project is the realisation of three previously unexecuted designs by Scottish architect Charles Rennie Mackintosh. In 1901, Mackintosh produced two speculative drawings, An Artist's Cottage and Studio and A Town House for an Artist. He also drew three preliminary sketches titled, Gate Lodge, Auchinbothie, Kilmalcolm, and the final drawing for the completed building. Ninety years later the architect Robert Hamilton Macintyre and his client, Peter Tovell, began work on the first of these unrealised domestic designs, The Artist's Cottage, at Farr near Inverness, Scotland.

== An Artist's Cottage and Studio ==
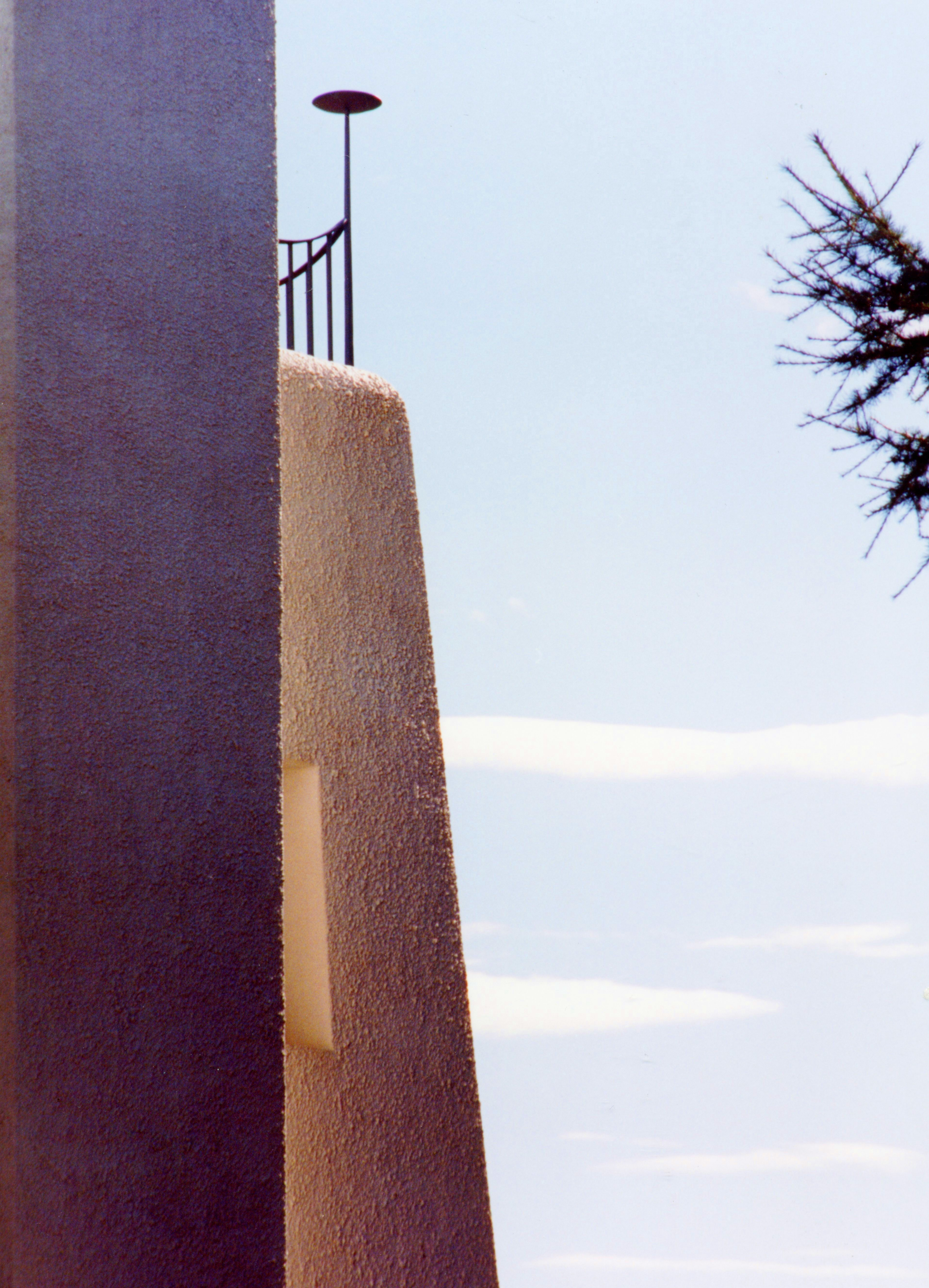
The Artist's Cottage, Farr, Inverness. Front elevation detail showing a vertical chimney stack, left, window ingoe in smooth render, centre, and angle of batter, right. The actual batter is 1.5 degrees but, because of the geometry of inclined planes intersecting, this can increase to 2.5 degrees depending upon the angle of view. The iron balustrade and stanchion marks the south-west corner of the roof terrace.

Known as The Artist's Cottage, Charles Rennie Mackintosh's An Artist's Cottage and Studio was built in the village of Farr by Inverness on an area of land to the south west of Achnabechan. The building consists of a two-storey cube with a single-storey wing enclosing a 'secret' walled garden. Excluding the east wing gable, all external walls have a 1.5 degree batter (incline on the outer face of the built wall). The plan footprint covers 230 square metres accommodating five en-suite bedrooms, a north-lit studio occupying half the first floor, a large roof terrace and public rooms appropriate for the scale of the building. Illustrations can be found on the RCAHMS Canmore site.

With only exterior elevations and floor plans to work from, the interiors were drawn from existing buildings of similar period and scale. The ogee timber plate rack for example, a feature in the entrance vestibule, cloakroom, drawing room, dining hall and studio, was machined to the profile Mackintosh used in Ruchill Church Hall. Exterior elements too, such as the artist blacksmith-work for the studio balcony and roof terrace, were fabricated to Mackintosh's specifications for other buildings, and applied to his elevations of vertical chimney stacks set against battered walls punctured by deeply pierced openings (illus). The sculptural form of the completed building has been compared to some of Mackintosh's contemporary and later drawings and watercolours, such as The Castle, Holy Island, 1901 and Le Fort Maillert, 1927.

Macintyre, acting as 'job architect' for the project, consulted his colleague, Prof Andy MacMillan, for advice on the detailing. Coincidentally, MacMillan was consultant for another Charles Rennie Mackintosh design, House for an Art Lover (1902), constructed at Bellahouston Park, Glasgow, a project initiated by Glasgow civil engineer, Graham Roxburgh. Macintyre, who studied at the Mackintosh School of Architecture, Glasgow School of Art (and began his career in the Glasgow offices of Keppie, Henderson and Partners, the successors to Mackintosh's practice), later worked for Gillespie, Kidd and Coia alongside Andy MacMillan and Isi Metzstein.

The Artist's Cottage was completed in 1992 to some considerable interest, with articles published by the CRM Society, Country Life and others, along with numerous press reports and TV, film and bibliography (see below).

The house has been in continuous use as a private residence, passing from Peter and Maxine Tovell to Mr and Mrs van Kessel in 1999. Throughout the five years following its completion The Artist's Cottage was made freely available to visitors by appointment and, on the solstice nights of 21 June 1996 and 1997, staged public art exhibitions, Midsummer Magic, managed by The Scottish Fine Art Group. These showed the work of Mike Forbes as solo exhibitor in 1996, and a shared exhibition by Suzanne Gyseman and Alexander Berdysheff in 1997. Berdysheff's work was a pre-showing of his solo exhibition for the 1997 Edinburgh International Festival held at the Edinburgh College of Art from 10 August of that year.

== A Town House for an Artist ==
Following the completion of The Artist's Cottage, Macintyre and Tovell turned their attention to Mackintosh's A Town House for an Artist, teaming up with gallery owner Ken Hardiman of Alder Arts (then of Church Street, Inverness) to form Mackintosh Galleries Ltd (27 March 1992), a Company dedicated to lobbying for the best use of Falcon Square, a derelict area of ground at the heart of Inverness. Macintyre, an established campaigner in civic redevelopment projects, proposed the unexecuted 3-storey A Town House for an Artist as centrepiece to an arts, heritage and tourist centre. As a prelude to that, and with Hardiman's expertise, Mackintosh Galleries Ltd set up The Scottish Fine Art Group and began staging regular arts events in the Inverness area.

Despite support, discussion, additions and amendments, the scheme failed to satisfy the planners and others, and the proposals were rejected in favour of a shopping complex.

== Gate Lodge, Auchinbothie #1 ==
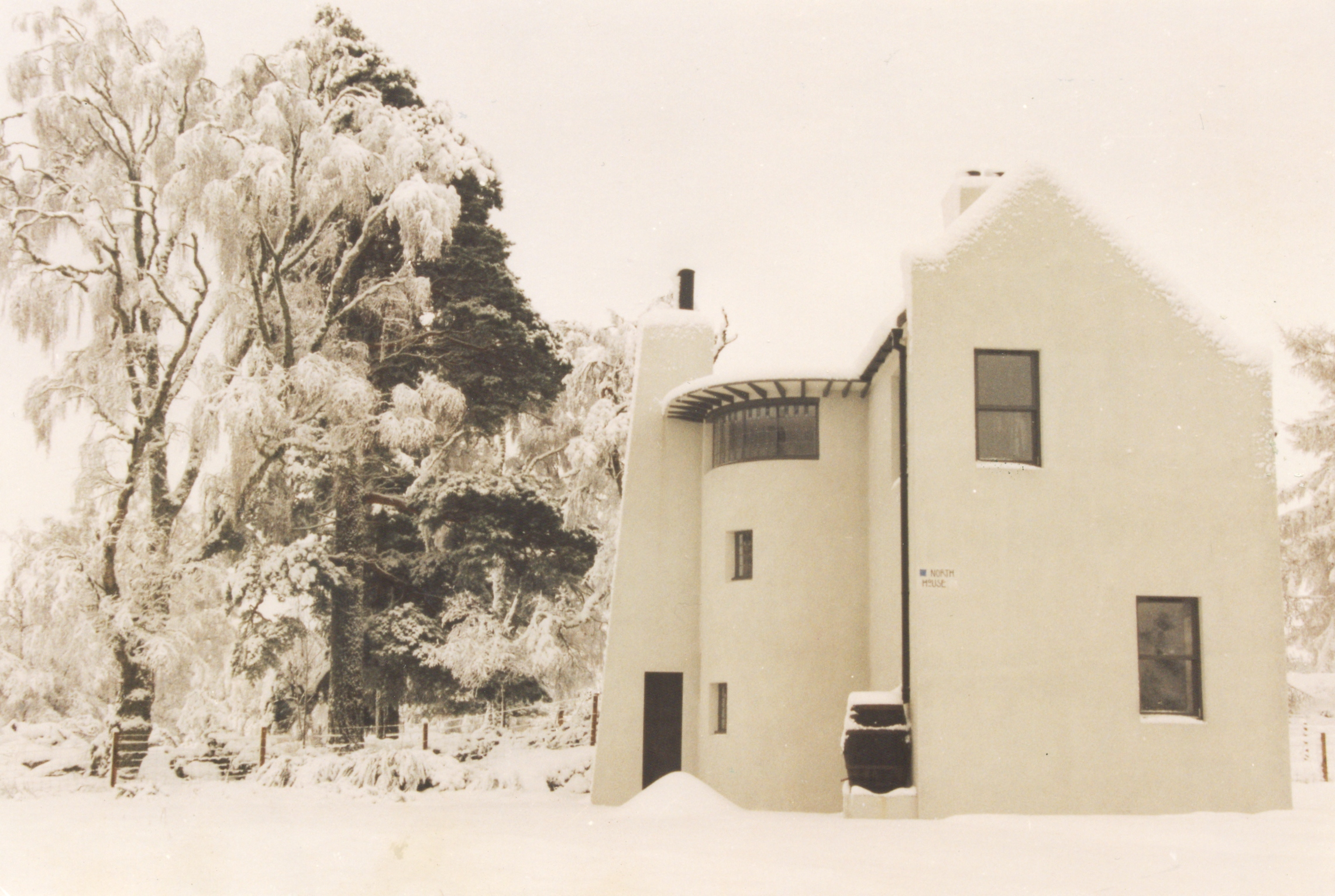
North House, Farr. West elevation from the B851 road showing the rounded stair tower with feature window above, battered chimney stack, vertical walls and coopered water butt.

In 1995 a pair of gatehouses were built to either side of the Achnabechan and The Artist's Cottage drives at the junction with the B851 highway. Known as North House and South House, their design utilised the first of the Gate Lodge, Auchinbothie sketches.

The houses are identical, but mirrored. The front doors of both face due east, yet the round stair tower of one is on the north side, the other on the south. In plan, each house is based on a square, a rectangle and a circle rising to two gables with rounded heads and five wall-plate levels. In keeping with the main house, the walls are rendered and wet harled, roofs slate or lead, wall heads rounded, and porches supported on tapered timber posts. The three houses have feature curved windows with projecting low pitched canopies - and coopered water butts (illus). The principal details not shared with the main house are the round stair towers, the absence of dressed masonry to the entrances, and the deliberately contrary vertical walls with battered chimney stacks. The Artist's Cottage has battered walls and vertical stacks. Apart from the novel design of spiral staircase, the interiors are plain. Detached matching garages were added later.

== Gate Lodge, Auchinbothie #2 ==
Though Macintyre died suddenly in the autumn of 1997, the project was continued with a request to build the second of the unexecuted Gate Lodge, Auchinbothie sketches. To be known as East House, the proposed site lay within 'Nursery Field', once part of the Achnabechan farm. But the application failed to gain lasting consent from the Inverness planning department.

"I just think this is too much of a good thing," one local councillor, and member of the planning committee, was reported to have given as her reason for planning permission to be rescinded. No further applications were lodged.

== Television and film productions ==
The Home Show Series, #2, Alan Douglas, "The Artist's Cottage". STV Scottish Television (Glasgow), broadcast 1995, run time 14min, all sequences.

Designs of the Times series, "Charles Rennie Mackintosh - a modern man". BBC Television (Scotland), broadcast 28 July 1996, run time 45min, intro and end sequences.

DVD "Charles Rennie Mackintosh - a modern man" released 7 June 2010, Beckmann Visual Publishing (Ramsey, Isle of Man).

== Geographical references ==
- The Artist's Cottage, Farr. Canmore ID 82860. NGR NH 6774 3148. 57.3545°N 4.1999°W
- North House, Farr. Canmore ID 280055. NGR NH 67678 31531. 57.3550°N 4.2010°W
- South House, Farr. Canmore ID 280056. NGR NH 67669 31513. 57.3548°N 4.2011°W
- Achnabechan, Farr. Canmore ID 114263. NGR NH 6780 3148. 57.3546°N 4.1990°W
- Ruchill Church Hall, Glasgow. Canmore ID 171830. NGR NS 57180 68307 55.88673°N 4.28372°W
- Queen's Cross Church, Glasgow. Canmore ID 44072. NGR NS 57976 67572. 55.8803°N 4.2719°W
- Falcon Square, Inverness. Canmore ID 98432. NGR NH 66839 45442. 57.4796°N 4.2225°W

== Bibliography ==
- McKean, Charles (1994). Scottish Dimensions, Diary 'January'. R.I.A.S. Publications, Edinburgh.
- McKean, Charles (1995). A Scottish Modernism 1933–1939. History Workshop Journal, Volume 40, Issue 1, doi:10.1093/hwj/40.1.165
- Knevitt, Charles (1994). Shelter, p94-5. Polymath Publishing, Streatley-on-Thames. ISBN 1-873224-04-4
- Wilhide, Elizabeth (1995). The Mackintosh Style, p149 and p152-3. Pavilion Books, London. ISBN 1-86205-121-6
- Glendinning, MacInnes and MacKechni (1996). A History of Scottish Architecture, Ch9 '1960 to the Present Day', p488. Edinburgh University Press, Edinburgh. ISBN 978-0748608492
