= Chris Dyson (architect) =

English architect

John Christopher Edward Dyson
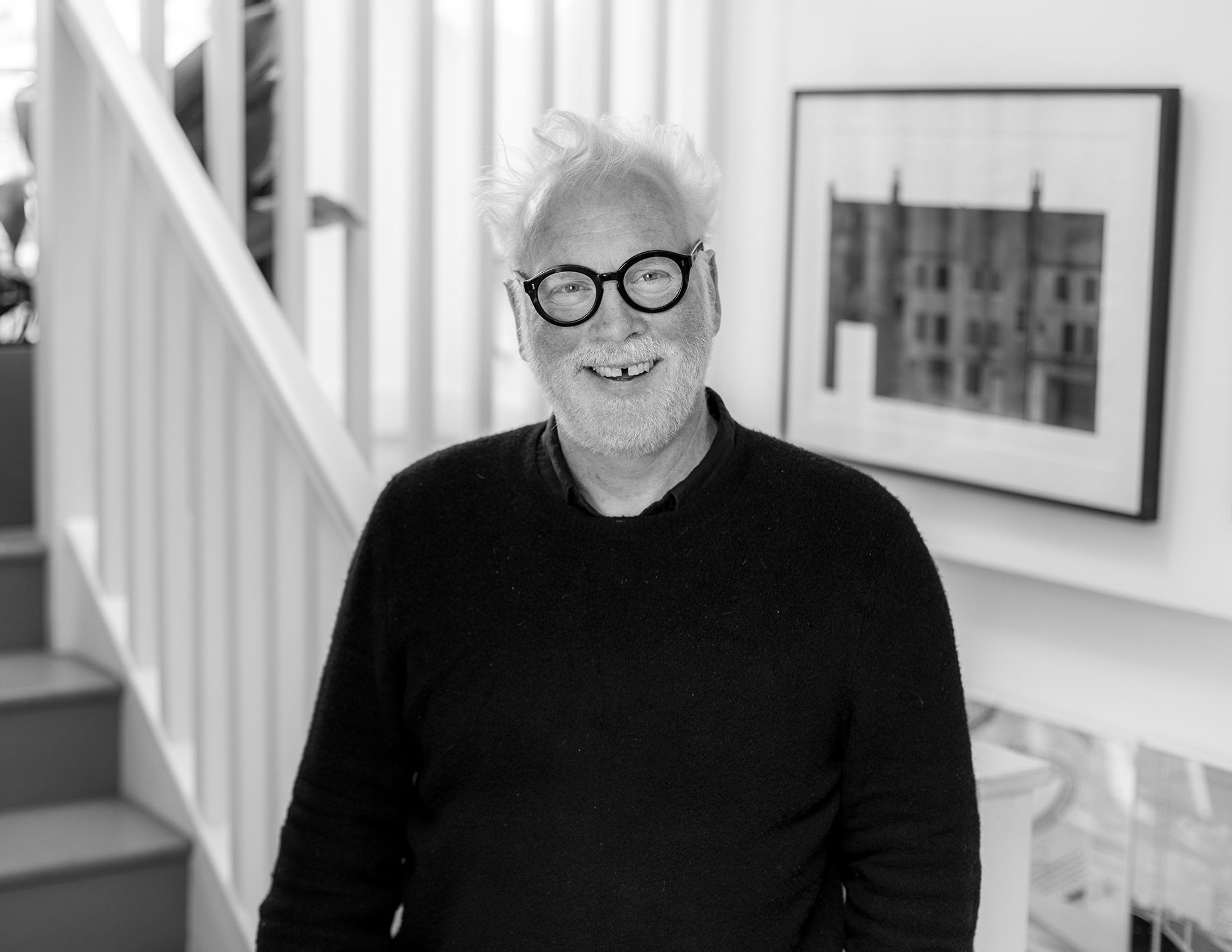
- Born: 6 October 1964 (age 62); London, England
- Education: School of Architecture, Oxford Brookes University, Mackintosh School of Architecture
- Occupation: Architect
- Practice: Chris Dyson Architects
- Projects: The Sekforde, London, UK (2002–2018) Albion Works, London, UK (2019) Crystal Palace Park Cafe, London, UK (2019) Gasworks, Gloucestershire, UK (2006) Cooperage, London, UK (2016) Museum of African Art and Culture, Stellenbosch, South Africa (competition, 2004)

Chris Dyson RIBA RIAS FRSA (born 6 October 1964) is an English architect. He established Chris Dyson Architects. in 2003. He is known for a contemporary approach to heritage conservation.

== Early career ==
Chris Dyson studied architecture at Oxford Brookes University and Mackintosh School of Architecture in Glasgow. He worked at James Stirling Michael Wilford and Associates on projects including Abando International passenger exchange. in Bilbao and Temasek Polytechnic in Singapore.

He spent three years as a design director at Sir Terry Farrell's practice Farrells.

== Chris Dyson Architects ==
Chris Dyson Architects was set up in 2003 by Chris Dyson. Their first major project was a design for a museum of African Art and Culture, which was not realised.

The studio is based in a restored pub in Spitalfields, London for which they received an RIBA Award, Chris Dyson Architects has completed a number of refurbishment and heritage conservation projects of buildings alongside civic arts projects.

== Notable works ==
=== Chris Dyson Architects ===
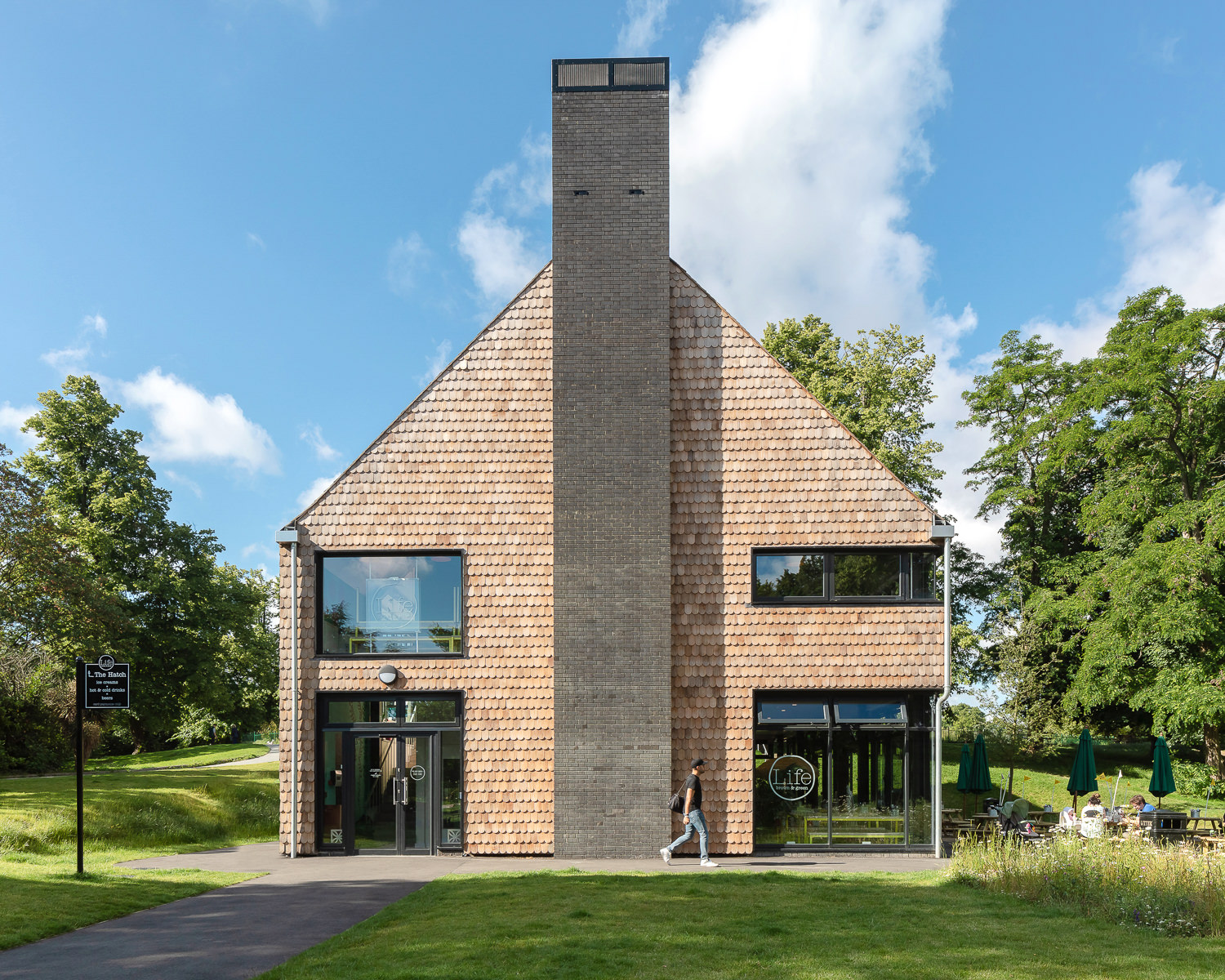
Crystal Palace Park Cafe

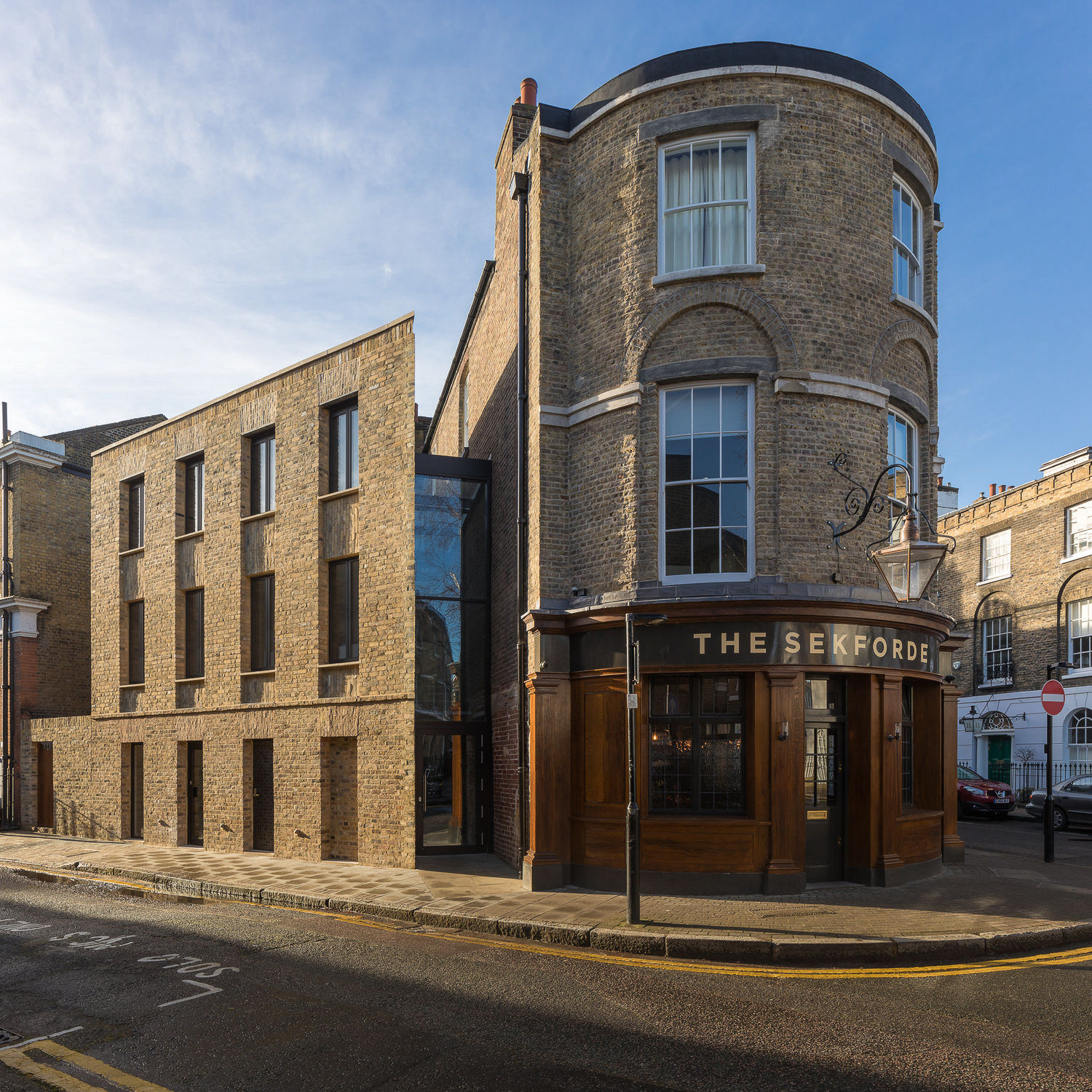
The Sekforde Arms

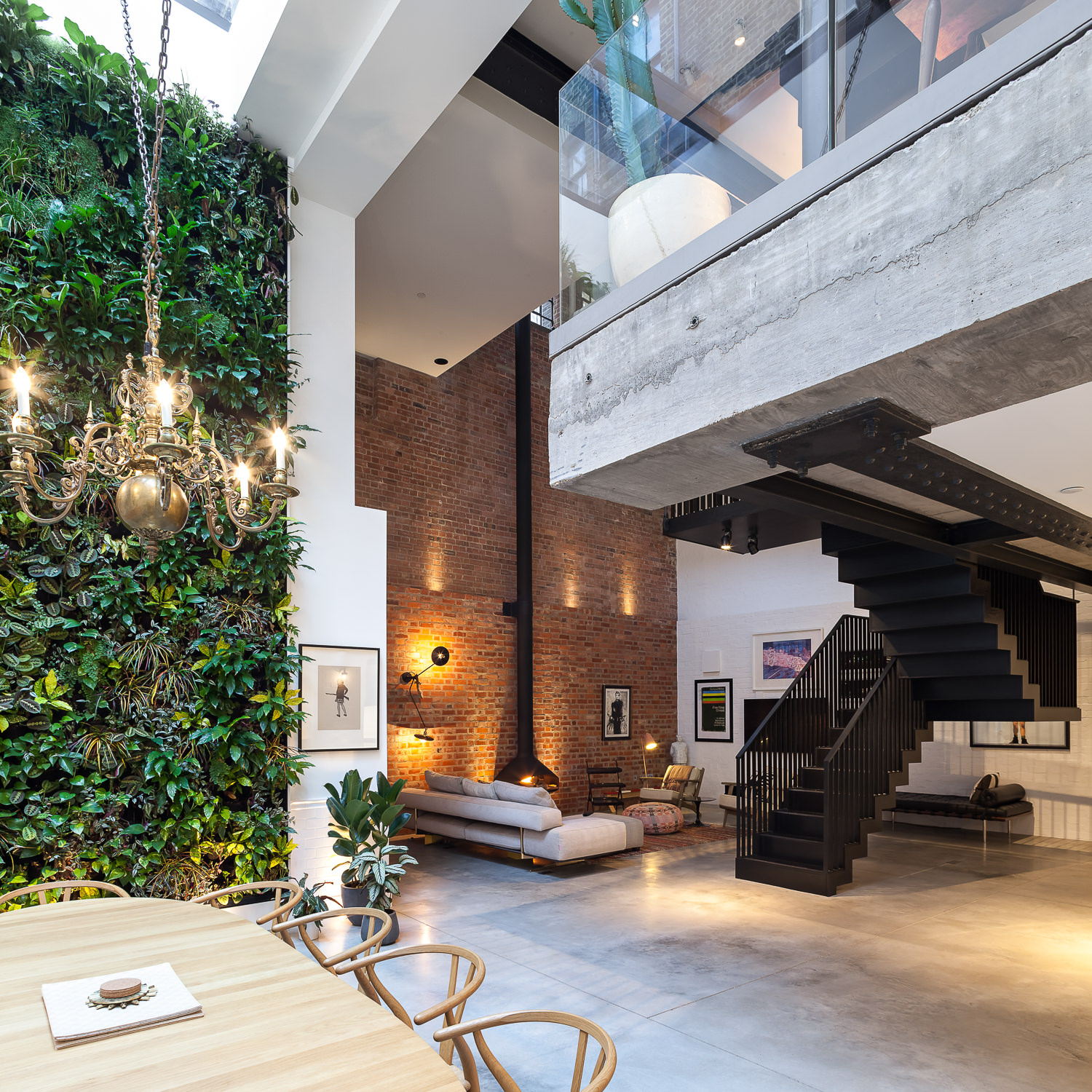
The Cooperage

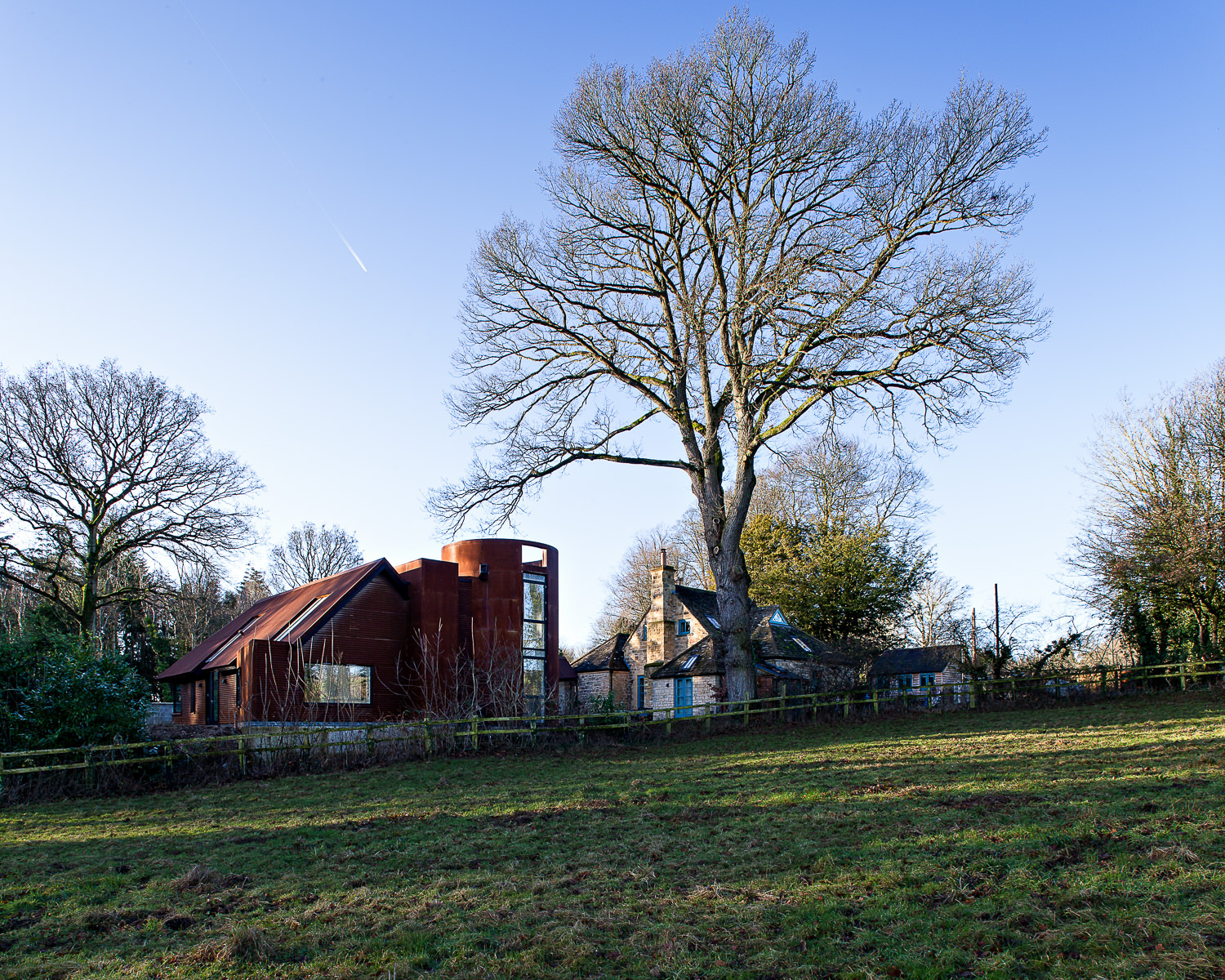
Gasworks
- Redchurch Street weavers tenements, London
- Harrow Arts Centre, Greenhill Building (2024)
- Maison Colbert, London (2023)
- Bishopsgate Goodsyard
- Crystal Palace Park Cafe (2019)
- Albion Works, (2018)
- The Sekforde Arms (2018)
- Eleven Spitalfields, London (2017)
- The Queen's Head (2017)
- Weaver's House (2017)
- The Cooperage, Clerkenwell (2016)
- Gasworks (2014)
- House in Wapping Pierhead, London (2013)
- Museum of African Art and Culture, South Africa, (unbuilt 2004)

=== Terry Farrell & Partners ===
- Lots Road Power Station, London (2017)
- The King Key Tower Shenzhen, Shenzhen, China (2011)
- The CITIC headquarters, Beijing (2011)
- Swiss Cottage Masterplan, Sports and Leisure building, London (2006)

=== James Stirling Michael Wilford & Partners ===
- Singapore Arts Centre, Singapore
- The British Embassy, Berlin (2000)
- Tate Liverpool, New sculpture and Temporary exhibition space (1998)
- Temasek Polytechnic, Singapore (1996)
- Abando International Passenger Interchange, Bilbao (unbuilt 1985-1992)
- Headquarters and Design facilities for RARE, Leicestershire
- B. Braun Melsungen New Administration Building and Masterplan (1992)
- Headquarters and Production Facilities for STO Weizen (2003)
- Music School and House of History, Stuttgart (1994)
- Regional Headquarters building, B.Braun, Switzerland (2001)
- Seville Stadium redevelopment, Seville

== Bibliography ==
- Dyson, Chris, (2009) 2Eight/five Chris Dyson Architects ISBN 9780956361103
- Dyson, Chris: Maxwell, Robert; Pallister, James; Winterson, Jeanette; McFadyen, Jock (2014) Practise and Projects : Chris Dyson Architects ISBN 9781908967329
