= Charles Rennie Mackintosh =

Scottish designer and artist (1868–1928)

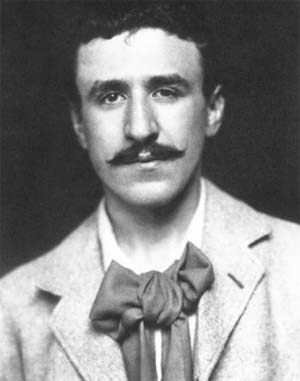
- Born: Charles Rennie McIntosh; 7 June 1868; Townhead, Glasgow, Scotland
- Died: 10 December 1928 (aged 60)
- Education: Glasgow School of Art
- Known for: Architecture, Art, Design, Decorative Arts
- Notable work: Glasgow School of Art, The Willow Tearooms, Hill House, Queen's Cross Church, Scotland Street School
- Style: Symbolism, Arts and Crafts, Art Nouveau, Glasgow Style
- Movement: Glasgow Style, Art Nouveau, Symbolism
- Spouse: Margaret Macdonald Mackintosh

Charles Rennie Mackintosh (7 June 1868 – 10 December 1928) was a Scottish architect, designer, water colourist and artist. His artistic approach had much in common with European Symbolism. His work, alongside that of his wife Margaret Macdonald, was influential on European design movements such as Art Nouveau and Secessionism and praised by great modernists such as Josef Hoffmann. Mackintosh was born in Glasgow, Scotland and died in London, England. He is among the most important figures of the Modern Style.

== Early life and education ==
Charles Rennie Mackintosh was born at 70 Parson Street, Townhead, Glasgow, on 7 June 1868, the fourth of eleven children and second son of William McIntosh, a superintendent and chief clerk of the City of Glasgow Police. He attended Reid's Public School and the Allan Glen's Institution from 1880 to 1883. William's wife Margaret Mackintosh née 'Rennie' grew up in the Townhead and Dennistoun (Firpark Terrace) areas of Glasgow.

== Name ==
He changed the spelling of his name from 'McIntosh' to 'Mackintosh' for unknown reasons, as his father did before him, around 1893. Confusion continues to surround the use of his name with 'Rennie' sometimes incorrectly substituted for his first name of 'Charles'. The modern use of 'Rennie Mackintosh' as a surname is also incorrect and he was never known as such in his lifetime; 'Rennie' being a middle name (his mother's maiden name) which he used often in writing his name. Signatures took various forms including 'C.R. Mackintosh' and 'Chas. R. Mackintosh.' The usage of "Rennie Mackintosh" to refer to him is therefore incorrect and he should instead be referred to as "Charles Rennie Mackintosh" or "Mackintosh". Mackintosh is also sometimes referred to affectionately as 'Toshie', a nickname seen in correspondence and other contemporary literature written by friends and family members.

== Career and family ==
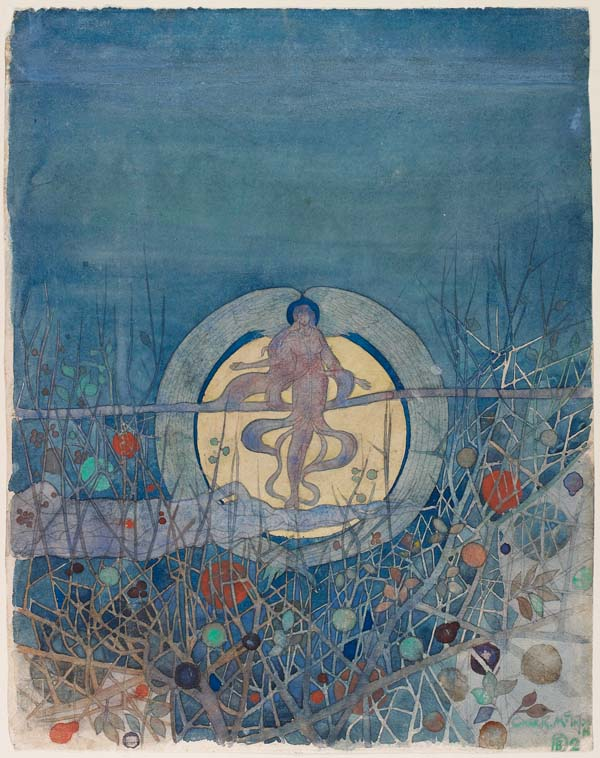
"The Harvest Moon", 1892 painting

Mackintosh entered the architectural profession in 1884 as an apprentice to John Hutchinson in Glasgow and in the evenings studied at Glasgow School of Art (situated then in Sauchiehall Street) where he became a prize-winning student. In 1889 he joined Honeyman and Keppie (John Honeyman and John Keppie), a major architectural practice as a draughtsman and designer, where in 1901 he became a partner.

His early design work as a draughtsman and lead designer can be seen from 1893 in the interior of Craigie Hall, Dumbreck, and in the new saloon and gallery of Glasgow Art Club, 185 Bath Street for which he signed the drawings.

The Room de Luxe in the Willow Tearooms as it was in 1903, with furniture and interior design by Mackintosh and Macdonald

Around 1892, Mackintosh met fellow artist Margaret Macdonald at the Glasgow School of Art. He and fellow student Herbert MacNair, also an apprentice at Honeyman and Keppie, were introduced to Margaret and her sister Frances MacDonald by the head of the Glasgow School of Art, Francis Henry Newbery, who saw similarities in their work. Margaret and Charles married on 22 August 1900. The couple had no children. MacNair and Frances also married the previous year. The group worked collaboratively and came to be known as "The Four", and were prominent figures in Glasgow Style art and design. Mackintosh and Margaret married, setting up their first home in Mains Street on Blythswood Hill, the street later being renamed as Blythswood Street, Glasgow. Subsequently, they moved to Southpark Avenue, close to Glasgow University.

In the early 1910s the partnership known from 1901 as Honeyman, Keppie & Mackintosh declined in profitability, and in 1913 Mackintosh resigned from the partnership and attempted to open his own practice.

== Design influences ==
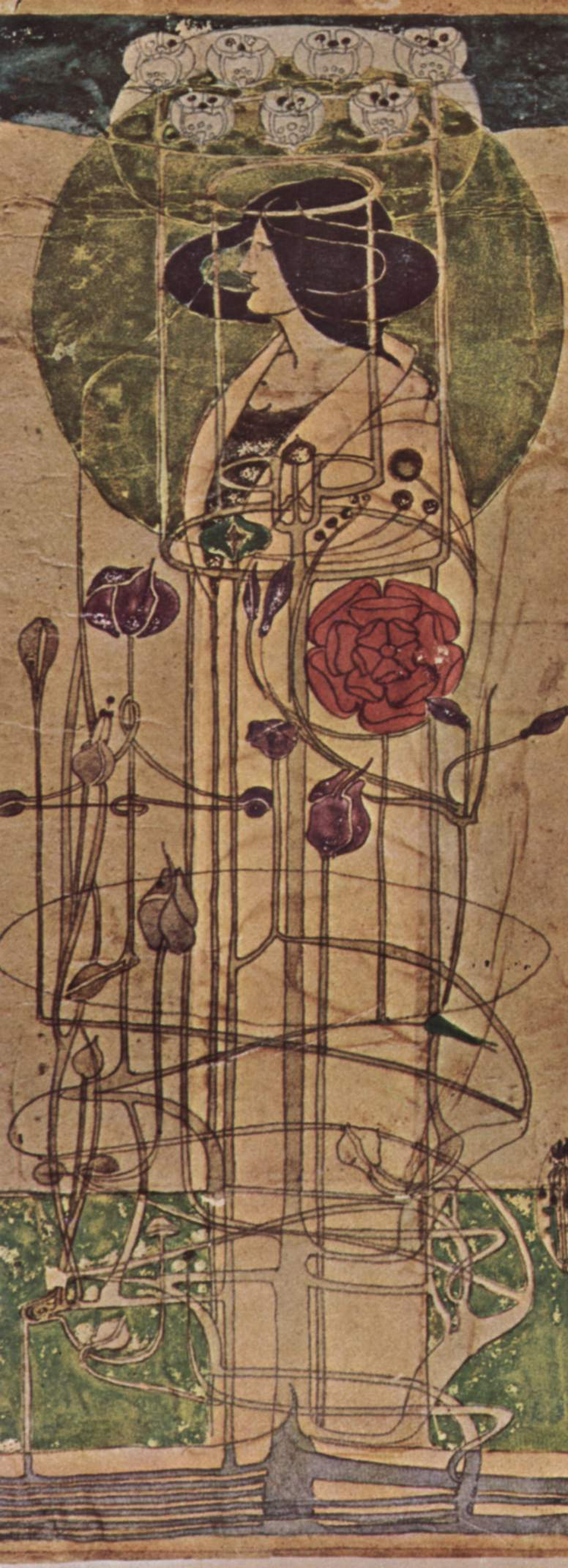
Design for a stencilled mural decoration for the Willow Tearooms (1896–1897)

Mackintosh lived most of his life in the city of Glasgow, located on the banks of the River Clyde. During the Industrial Revolution the city had one of the greatest production centres of heavy engineering and shipbuilding in the world. As the city grew and prospered, a faster response to the high demand for consumer goods and arts was necessary. Industrialized, mass-produced items started to gain popularity. Along with the Industrial Revolution, Asian style and emerging modernist ideas also influenced Mackintosh's designs. When the Japanese isolationist regime softened, they opened themselves to globalisation resulting in notable Japanese influence around the world. Glasgow's link with the eastern country became particularly close with shipyards at the River Clyde being exposed to Japanese navy and training engineers. Japanese design became more accessible and gained great popularity. In fact, it became so popular and so incessantly appropriated and reproduced by Western artists, that the Western world's fascination and preoccupation with Japanese art gave rise to the new term Japonisme or Japonism.

This style was admired by Mackintosh because of its restraint and economy of means rather than ostentatious accumulation; its simple forms and natural materials rather than elaboration and artifice; and its use of texture and light and shadow rather than pattern and ornament. In the old western style, furniture was seen as ornament that displayed the wealth of its owner; the value of the piece was established according to the length of time spent creating it. In the Japanese arts, furniture and design focused on the quality of the space, which was meant to evoke a calming and organic feeling to the interior.

At the same time a new philosophy concerned with creating functional and practical design was emerging throughout Europe: modernism. The central aim in modernism was to develop a purity of expression with designs explicitly responsive to intended building use. Ornament and traditional styles were demoted. Although Mackintosh has been counted as a pioneer of modernism, his work always retained a decorative sensibility and features ornament. Mackintosh took his inspiration from his Scottish upbringing and blended them with the flourish of Art Nouveau and the simplicity of Japanese forms.

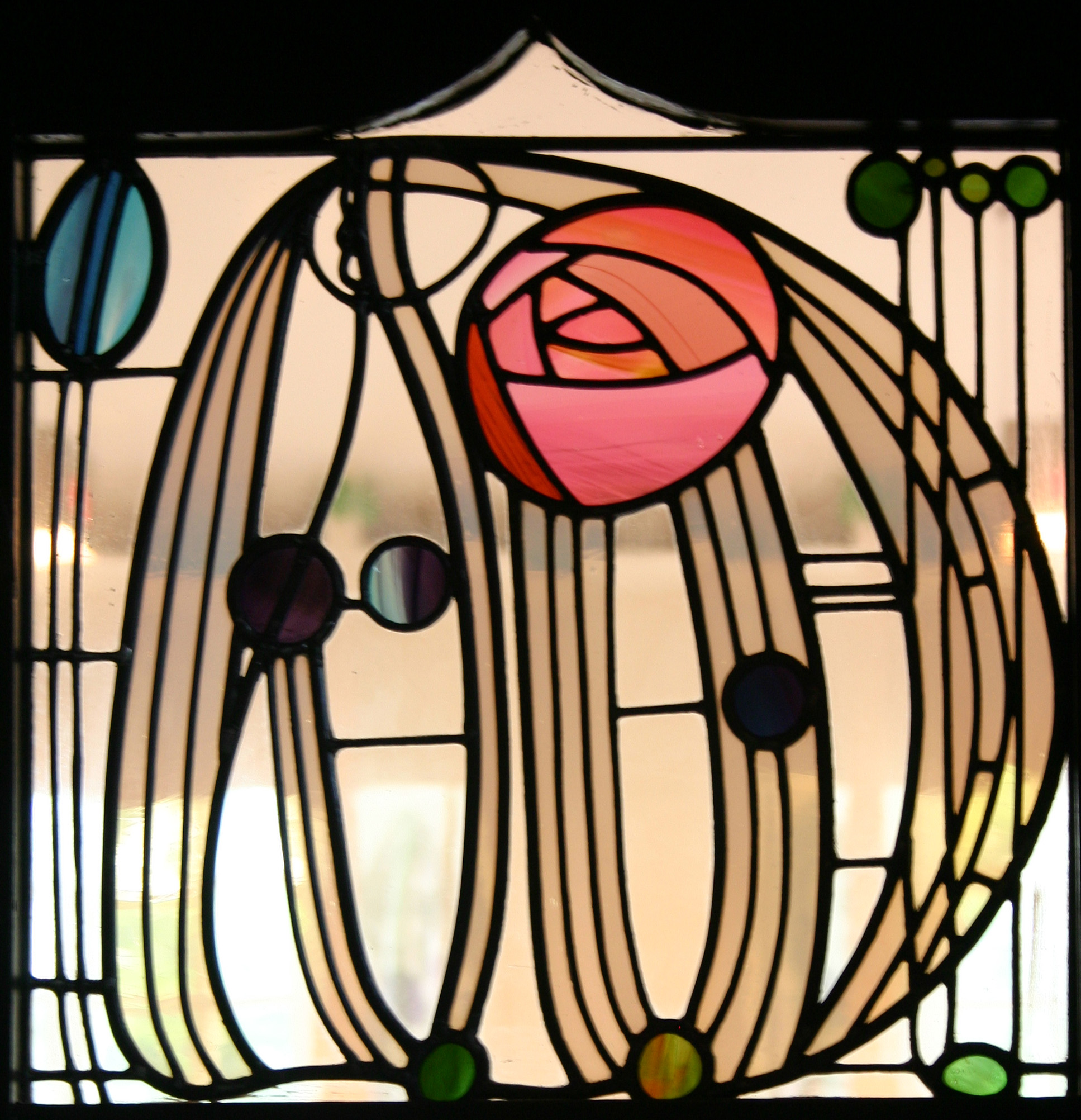
Mackintosh Rose window at Hill House, Helensburgh

While working in architecture, Charles Rennie Mackintosh developed his own style: a contrast between strong right angles and floral-inspired decorative motifs with subtle curves (for example, the Mackintosh Rose motif), along with some references to traditional Scottish architecture. The project that helped make his international reputation was the Glasgow School of Art (1897–1909). During the early stages of the Glasgow School of Art Mackintosh also completed the Queen's Cross Church project in Maryhill, Glasgow. It is the only built Mackintosh church design and is now the Charles Rennie Mackintosh Society headquarters. As with his contemporary Frank Lloyd Wright, Mackintosh's architectural designs often included extensive specifications for the detailing, decoration, and furnishing of his buildings.

It has been suggested that this detailing may have been carried out in part by his wife Margaret Macdonald Mackintosh whom Charles had met when they both attended the Glasgow School of Art. However scholarly evidence for this is scant relying on stylistic analysis or speculation; little documentary material is extant. Their work was shown at the eighth Vienna Secession Exhibition in 1900. Mackintosh's architectural career was a relatively short one, but of significant quality and impact. All his major commissions were between 1895 and 1906, including designs for private homes, commercial buildings, interior renovations and churches.

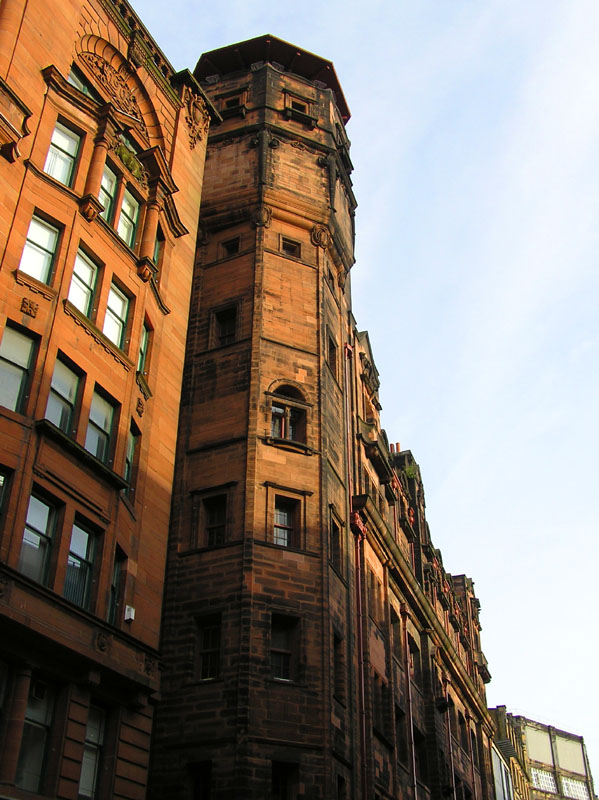
"The Lighthouse", Charles Mackintosh's Glasgow Herald building

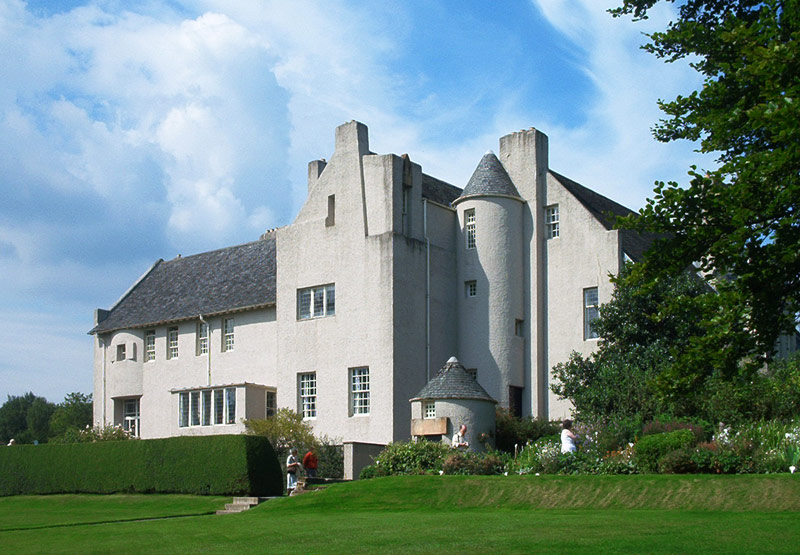
Hill House, Helensburgh, near Glasgow

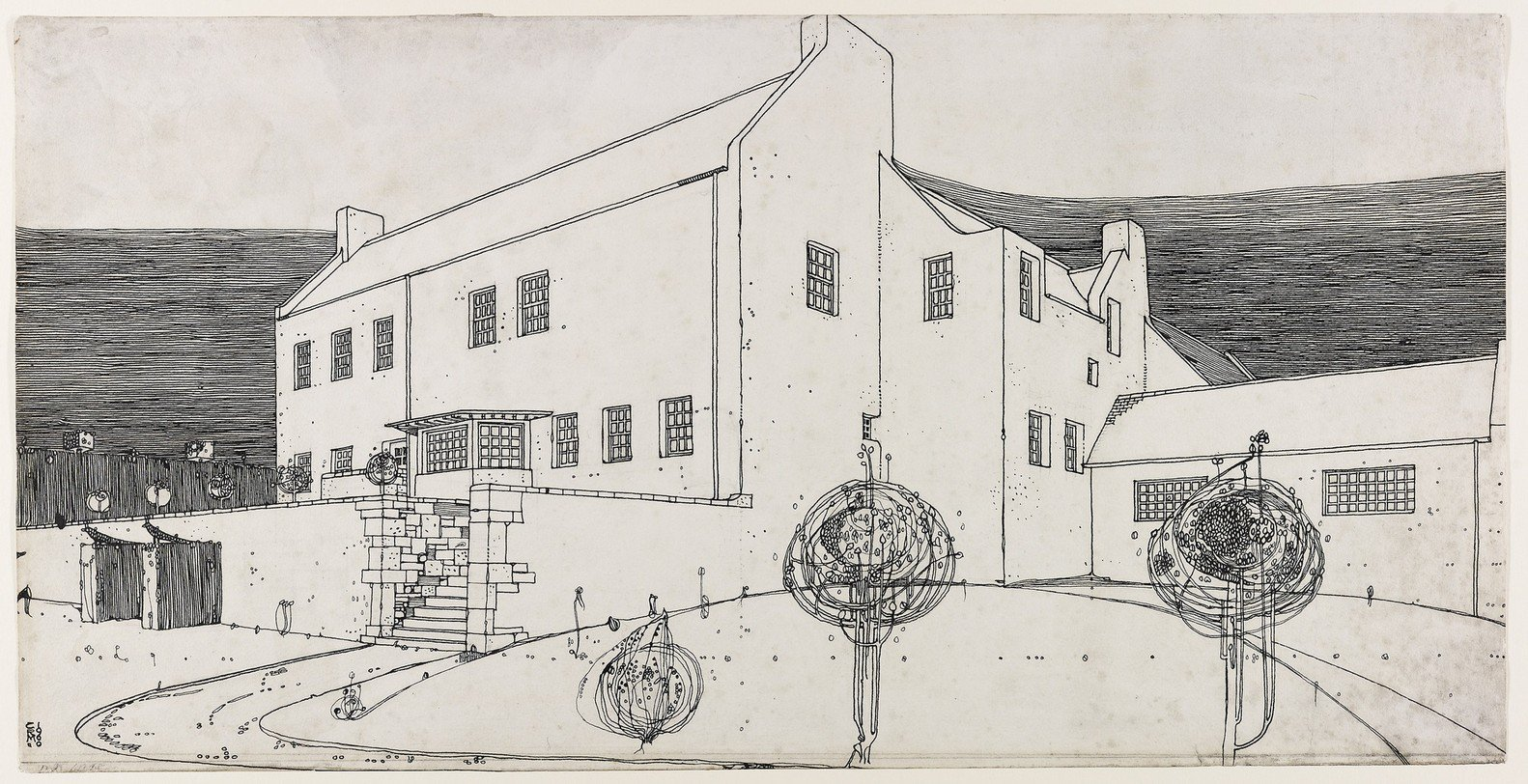
Mackintosh's drawing for Windy Hill, at Kilmacolm

- Interior designs for his brother-in-law, Charles Macdonald at Dunglass
- Hill House, Helensburgh This dwelling is one of the last complete sites, that is filled with furnishing and fittings, designed by Mackintosh in Scotland. Mackintosh paid attention to detail with every aspect of this property.
- The Willow Tearooms, Sauchiehall Street, Glasgow for Catherine Cranston
- Former Daily Record offices, Glasgow
- Former Glasgow Herald offices in Mitchell Street, now The Lighthouse – Scotland's Centre for Design and Architecture
- 78 Derngate, Northampton (interior design and architectural remodelling for Wenman Joseph Bassett-Lowke, founder of Bassett-Lowke)
- 5 The Drive, Northampton (for Bassett-Lowke's brother-in-law)

=== Unbuilt designs ===
Although moderately popular (for a period) in his native Scotland, most of Mackintosh's more ambitious designs were not built. Designs for various buildings for the 1901 Glasgow International Exhibition were not constructed, neither was his "Haus eines Kunstfreundes" (Art Lover's House) of the same year. He competed in the 1903 design competition for Liverpool Cathedral, but failed to gain a place on the shortlist (the winner was Giles Gilbert Scott).

Other unbuilt Mackintosh designs include:

- Railway Terminus
- Concert Hall
- Alternative Concert Hall
- Bar and Dining Room
- Exhibition Hall
- Science and Art Museum
- Chapter House

The House for An Art Lover (1901) was built in Bellahouston Park, Glasgow after his death (1989–1996).

An Artist's Cottage and Studio (1901), known as The Artist's Cottage, was completed at Farr by Inverness in 1992. The architect was Robert Hamilton Macintyre acting for Dr and Mrs Peter Tovell. Illustrations can be found on the RCAHMS Canmore site.

The first of the unexecuted Gate Lodge, Auchinbothie (1901) sketches was realised as a mirrored pair of gatehouses to either side of the Achnabechan and The Artist's Cottage drives, also at Farr by Inverness. Known as North House and South House, these were completed 1995–1997.

Mackintosh's architectural output was small, but he did influence European design. Popular in Austria and Germany, his work received acclaim when it was shown at the Vienna Secession Exhibition in 1900. It was also exhibited in Budapest, Hungary, Munich, Germany, Dresden, Venice, Italy and Moscow, Russia.

== Design work and paintings ==
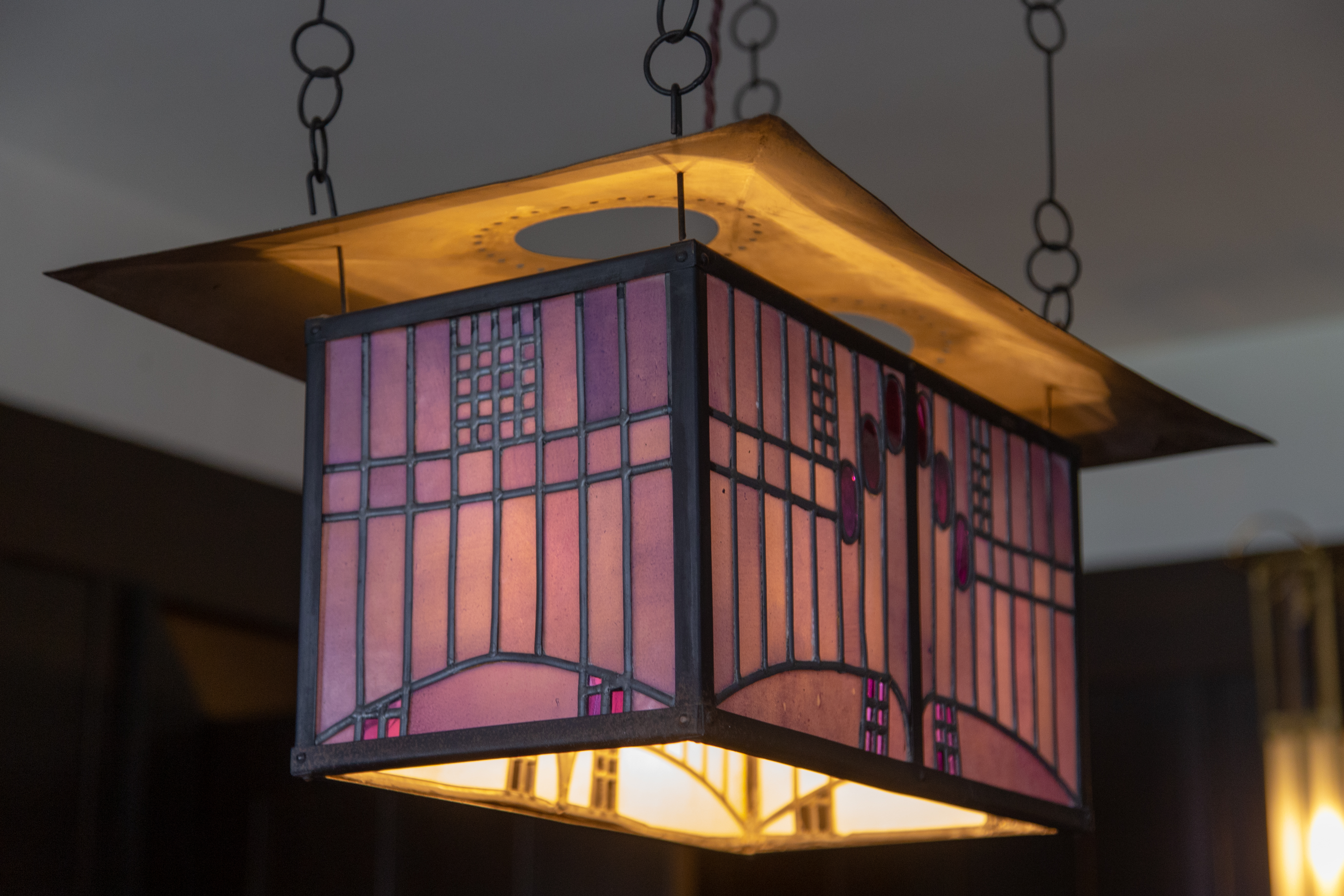
Light fixture from Hill House, 1902–1904

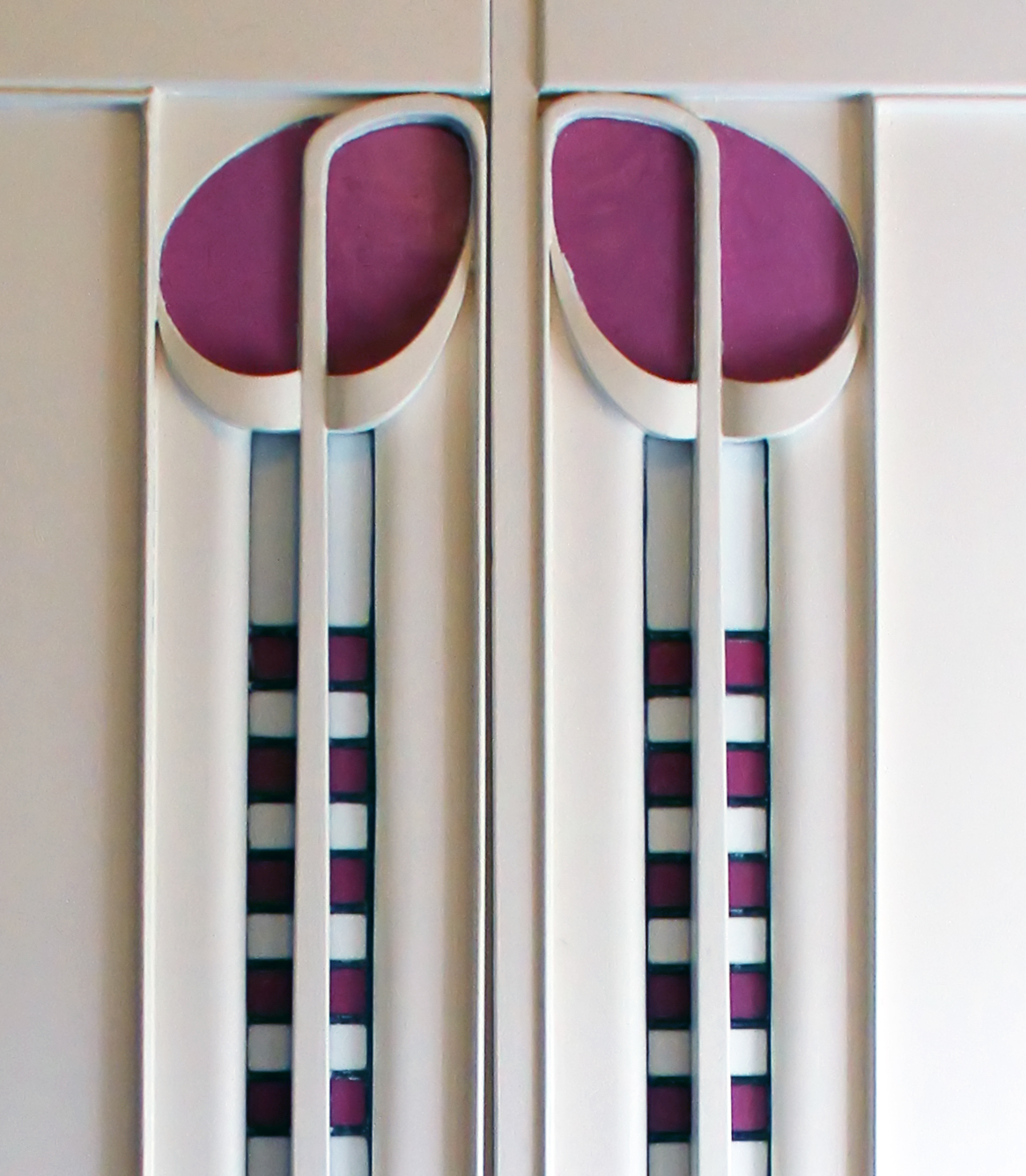
Detail from bedroom in Hill House, 1902–1904

Mackintosh, his future wife Margaret MacDonald, her sister Frances MacDonald, and Herbert MacNair met at evening classes at the Glasgow School of Art (see above). They became known as a collaborative group, "The Four", or "The Glasgow Four", and were prominent members of the "Glasgow School" movement. The group exhibited in Glasgow, London, England and Vienna, Austria. These exhibitions helped establish Mackintosh's reputation. The so-called "Glasgow" style was exhibited in Europe and influenced the Viennese Art Nouveau movement known as Sezessionstil (in English, the Vienna Secession) around 1900.

Mackintosh also worked in interior design, furniture, textiles and metalwork. Much of this work combines Mackintosh's own designs with those of his wife, whose flowing, floral style complemented his more formal, rectilinear work. The publishing house Blackie and Son commissioned him in the 1920s to work on bindings for their publications. One of these works was an abstract design that was intended for a new uniform of G. A. Henty's novels. It was instead used for Yarns on the Beach by Henty, and for a series entitled The Boys and Girls Bookshelf, c. 1926. Both Newbolt and Floyer speculate that Mackintosh may have designed the cover for another series by Blackie.

== Later life ==
Later in life, disillusioned with architecture, Mackintosh worked largely as a watercolourist, painting numerous landscapes and flower studies (often in collaboration with Margaret, with whose style Mackintosh's own gradually converged). They moved to the Suffolk village of Walberswick in 1914. There Mackintosh was suspected of being a German spy and briefly arrested in 1915 during World War I.

By 1923, the Mackintoshes had moved to Port Vendres, a Mediterranean coastal town in southern France with a warm climate that was a comparably cheaper location in which to live. Mackintosh had entirely abandoned architecture and design and concentrated on watercolour painting. He was interested in the relationships between man-made and naturally occurring landscapes and created a large portfolio of architecture and landscape watercolour paintings. Many of his paintings depict Port Vendres, a small port near the Spanish border, and the landscapes of Roussillon. The local Charles Rennie Mackintosh Trail details his time in Port Vendres and shows the paintings and their locations. The couple remained in France for two years, before being forced to return to London in 1927 due to illness.

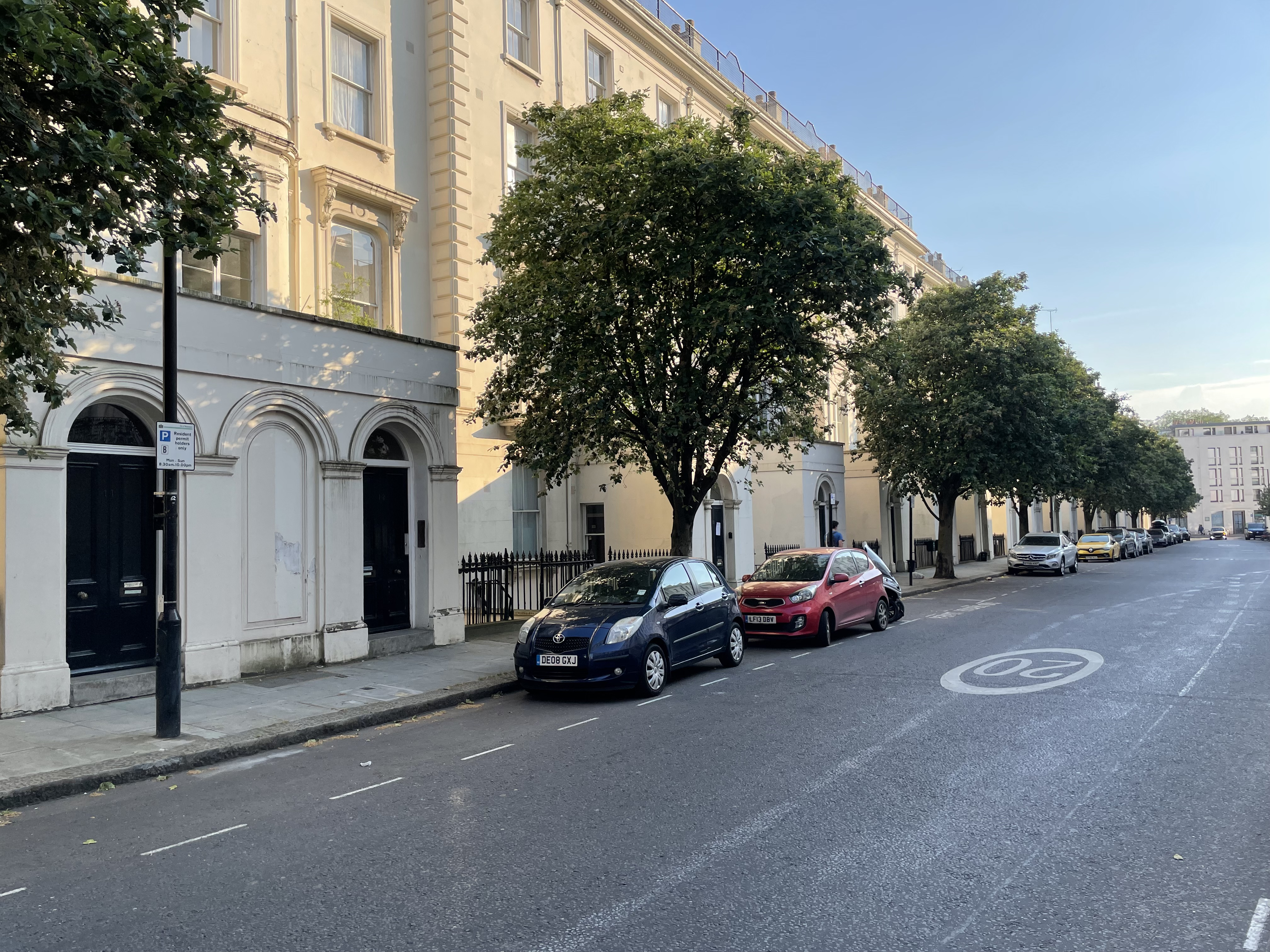
12 Porchester Square in the foreground on the left, and number 26 in the far distance on the right

That year, Mackintosh had developed a lump in his tongue and a doctor friend in Port Vendres recommended that he return to London for treatment. In London, after a diagnosis of tongue cancer, a friend Jessie Newbery arranged for treatment at Westminster Hospital where the lump was surgically removed. Their friends Randolph & Birdie Schwabe found a home for Mackintosh to convalesce on Willow Road in Hampstead, where he could sit under a willow tree that reminded him of Sauchiehall Street. Another friend Margaret Morris visited him there, and firstly tried to help him with voice exercises to strengthen his voice which had been weakened by the surgery, but when that failed she tried to teach him sign language. A dispute with the upstairs neighbours in Hampstead forced Mackintosh and his wife to quickly seek other lodgings, and another friend Desmond Chapman-Huston offered his home at 12 Porchester Square, Bayswater, returning the hospitality that they had shown him whenever he had visited them in Glasgow. After a relapse Mackintosh was admitted to a nursing home just along the road at 26 Porchester Square where he died on 10 December 1928 at the age of 60. He was cremated the next day at Golders Green Crematorium in London. His ashes were scattered, in accordance with his wishes, over the Mediterranean at Port Vendres from one of the rocks he had painted.

== Retrospect ==
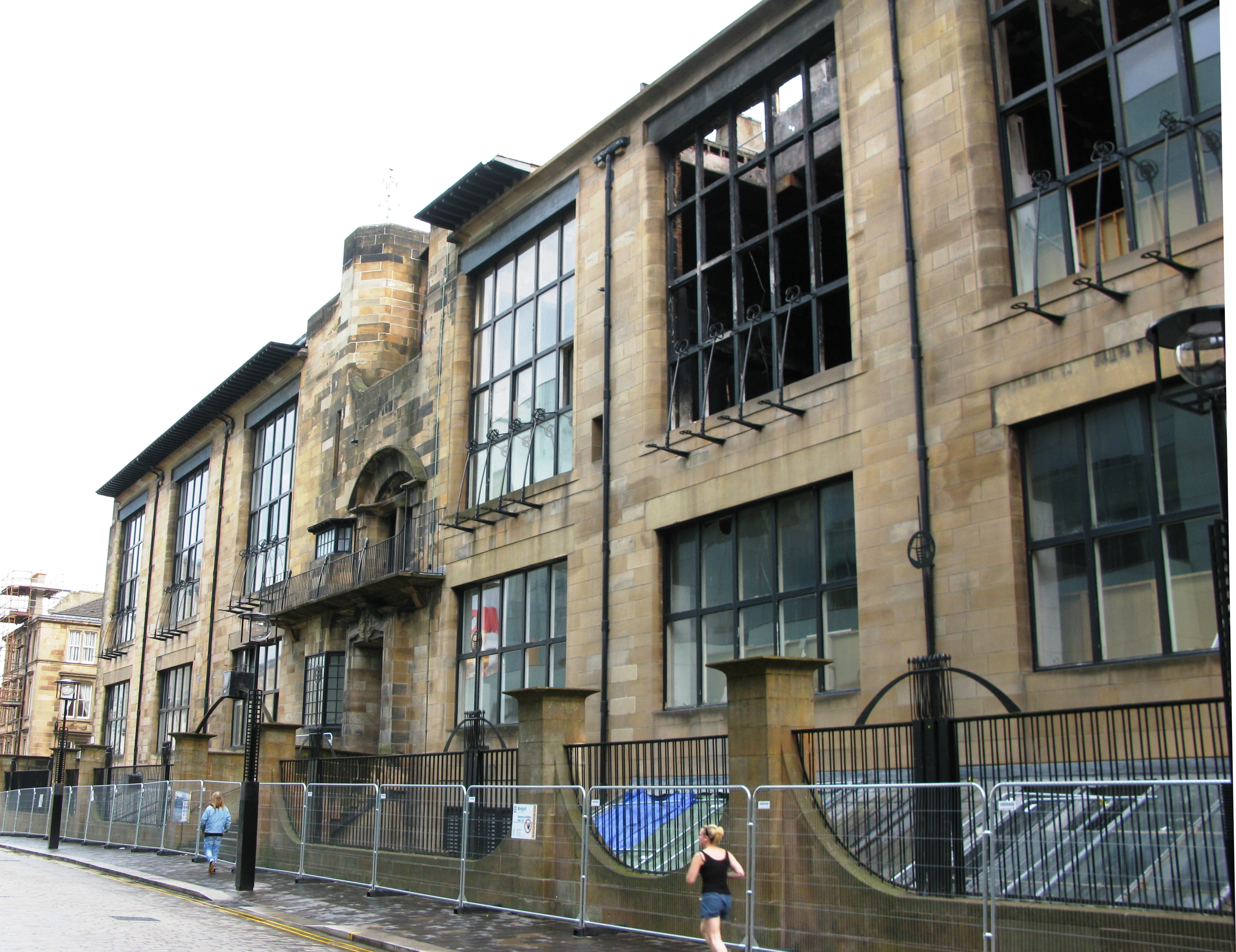
The front (north) CM Mackintosh's Glasgow School of Art on Renfrew Street, Garnethill in Glasgow, Scotland

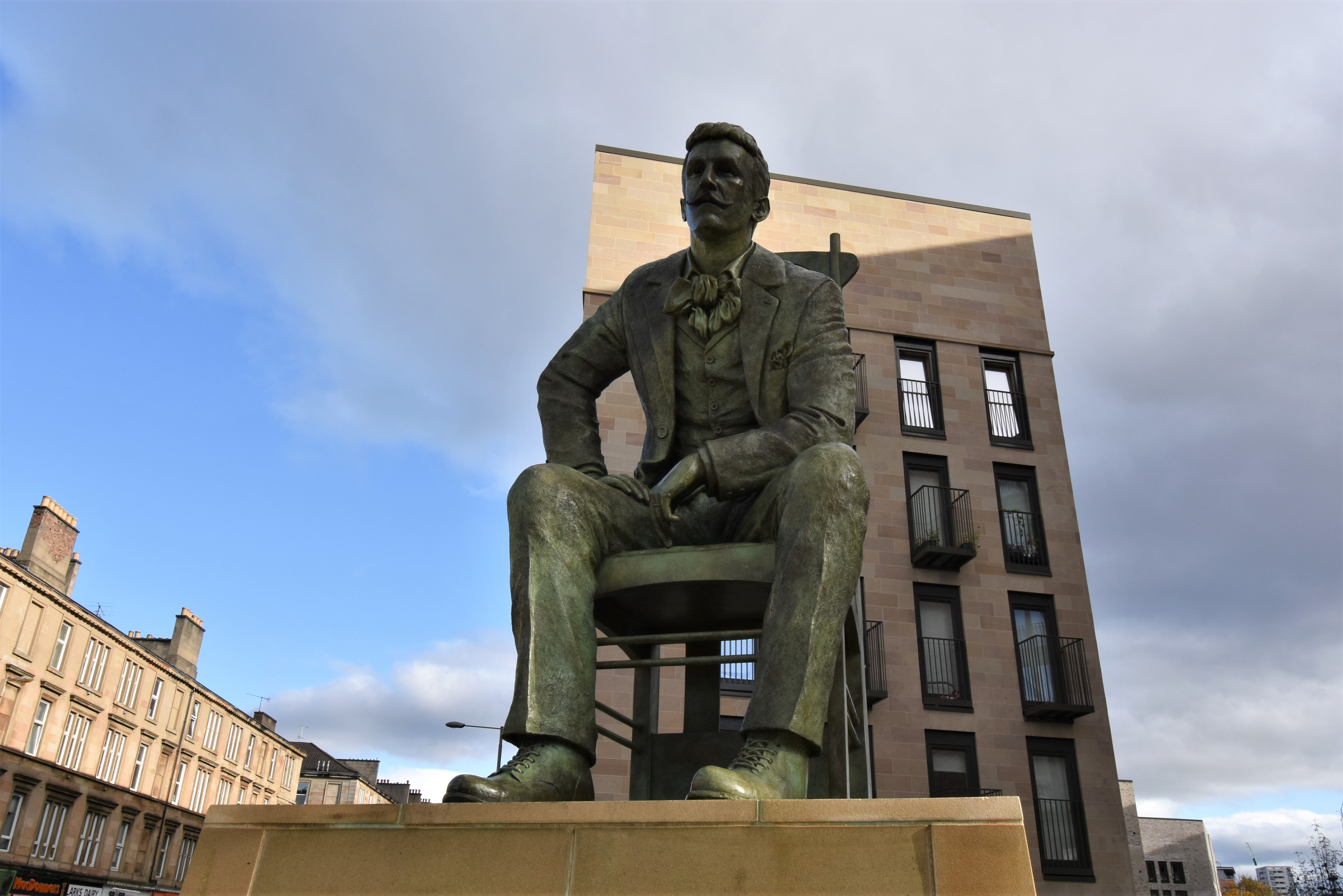
Glasgow. Statue of Mackintosh, unveiled on the 90th anniversary of his death. Sculptor: Andy Scott

Mackintosh's work grew in popularity in the decades following his death. A number of posthumous presentations of his designs have been implemented. The Mackintosh House (1981) is a dedicated structure by William Whitfield to house the reconstructed interiors of the Mackintoshes former Glasgow home (sited nearby and demolished in 1963). The house forms an integral part of The University of Glasgow's Hunterian Museum and Art Gallery home to the world's largest collection of Mackintosh's work. The Artist's Cottage project, three unrealised designs from 1901, were constructed as interpretations near Inverness in 1992 and 1995.

The House for an Art Lover was built and opened in Glasgow's Bellahouston Park in 1996. It operates as an arts and cultural centre, being the interpretation of a design competition portfolio in 1901 by Mackintosh and Macdonald.

Mackintosh's design language continues to be echoed in modern buildings in Glasgow - for instance the replacement Glasgow Sheriff Court, built in the 1980s to a design by the successor firm to Mackintosh's old employer - Keppie Design - incorporates many interior features which are a modern interpretation of Mackintosh's style.

The Glasgow School of Art building (now "The Mackintosh Building") is cited by architectural critics as among the finest buildings in the UK. On 23 May 2014 the building was ravaged by fire. The library was destroyed, but firefighters managed to save the rest of the building. On 15 June 2018, about a year before completion of the restoration of the building the School was again struck by fire. This second fire caused catastrophic damage, effectively destroying all the interiors and leaving the outer walls so structurally unstable that large sections of them had to be taken down to prevent uncontrolled collapse. Such was the concern that a public commitment to faithfully rebuild The Mackintosh Building was made post-fire by then Director of The Glasgow School of Art, Tom Inns.

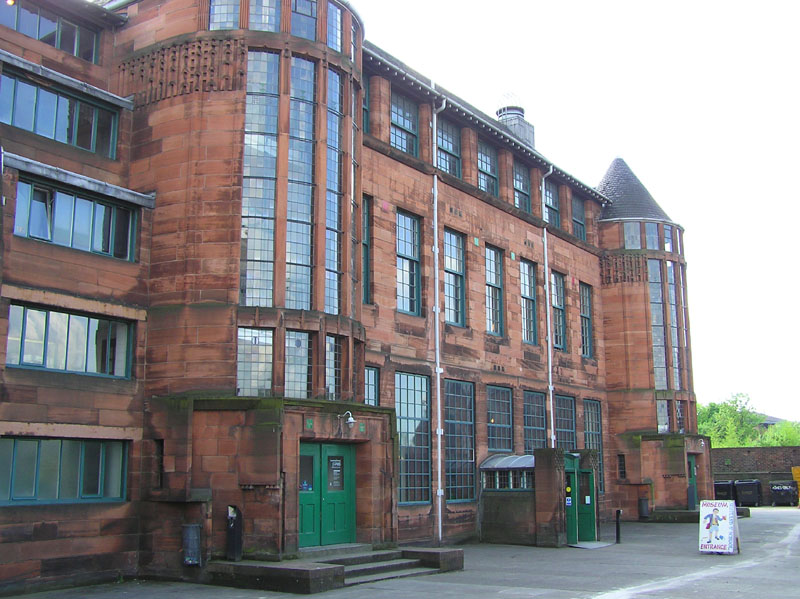
Scotland Street school in Glasgow

The Charles Rennie Mackintosh Society encourages greater awareness of the work of Mackintosh as an architect, artist and designer. The rediscovery of Mackintosh as a significant figure in design has been attributed to the designation of Glasgow as European City of Culture in 1990, and exhibition of his work which accompanied the year-long festival. His enduring popularity since has been fuelled by further exhibitions and books and memorabilia which have illustrated aspects of his life and work. The growth in public interest has led to refurbishment of long-neglected buildings and increased public access: Scotland Street School Museum housed in Mackintosh's 1906 school building opened in 1990. 78 Derngate Northampton opened as a visitor attraction in 2003. The Willow Tea Rooms re-opened following an extensive restoration in 2018.

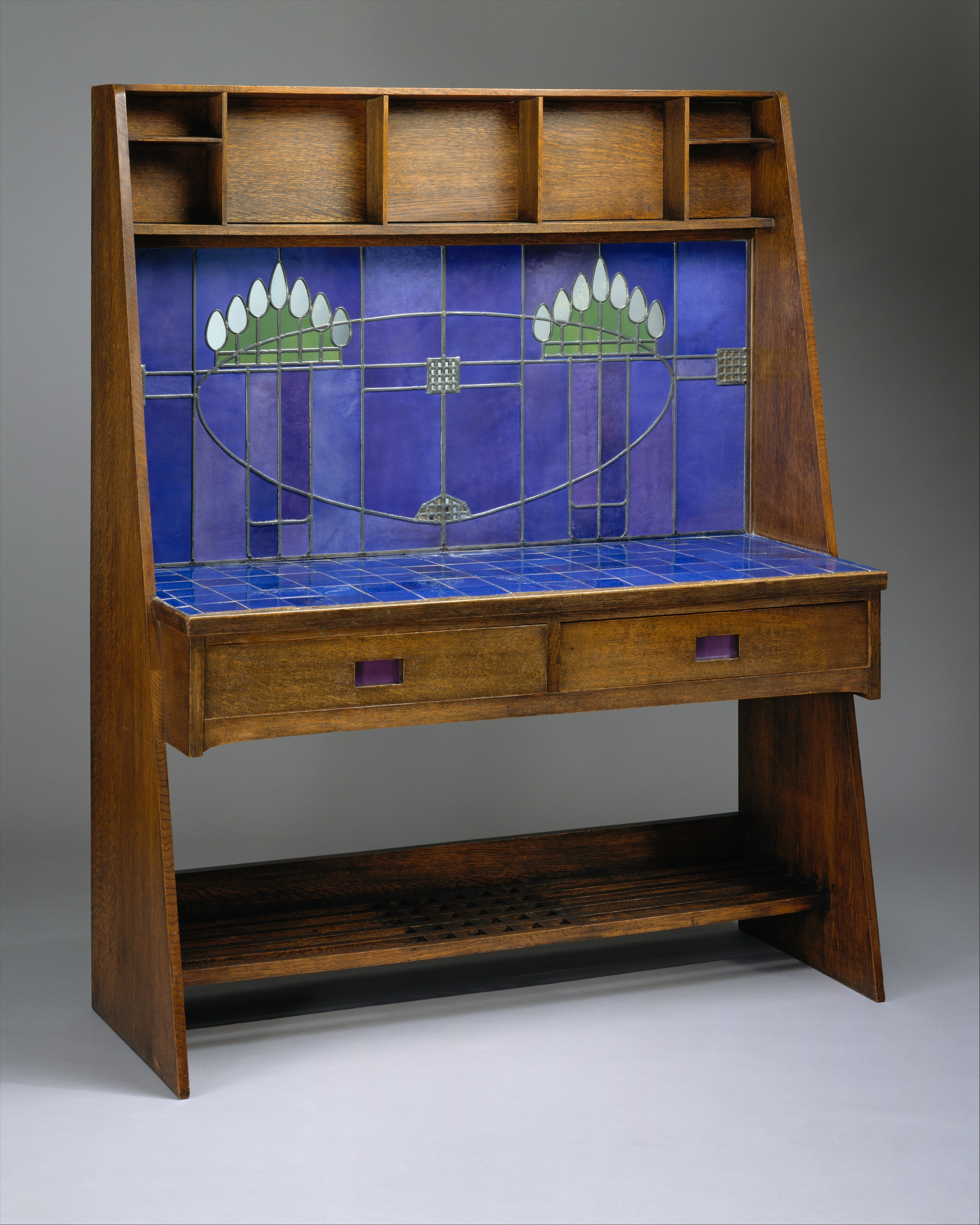
Washstand designed by Mackintosh (1904), featured in the Metropolitan Museum of Art exhibition in 1996–1997

The Metropolitan Museum of Art in New York City held a major retrospective exhibition of Charles Rennie Mackintosh's works from 21 November 1996 to 16 February 1997. In conjunction with the exhibit were lectures and a symposium by scholars, including Pamela Robertson of the Hunterian Art Gallery, Glasgow art gallery owner Roger Billcliffe, and architect J. Stewart Johnson, and screening of documentary films about Mackintosh.

Charles Rennie Mackintosh was commemorated on a series of banknotes issued by the Clydesdale Bank in 2009; his image appeared on an issue of £100 notes.

In 2012, one of the largest collections of art by Charles Rennie Mackintosh and the Glasgow Four Glasgow School was sold at auction in Edinburgh for £1.3m. The sale included work by Mackintosh's sister-in-law Frances Macdonald and her husband Herbert MacNair.

In July 2015 it was announced that Mackintosh's designs for a tearoom would be reconstructed to form a display in Dundee's new V&A museum. Although the original building which housed the tearoom on Glasgow's Ingram Street was demolished in 1971 the interiors had all been dismantled and put into storage. The restored "Oak Room" was revealed when V&A Dundee opened to the public on 15 September 2018.

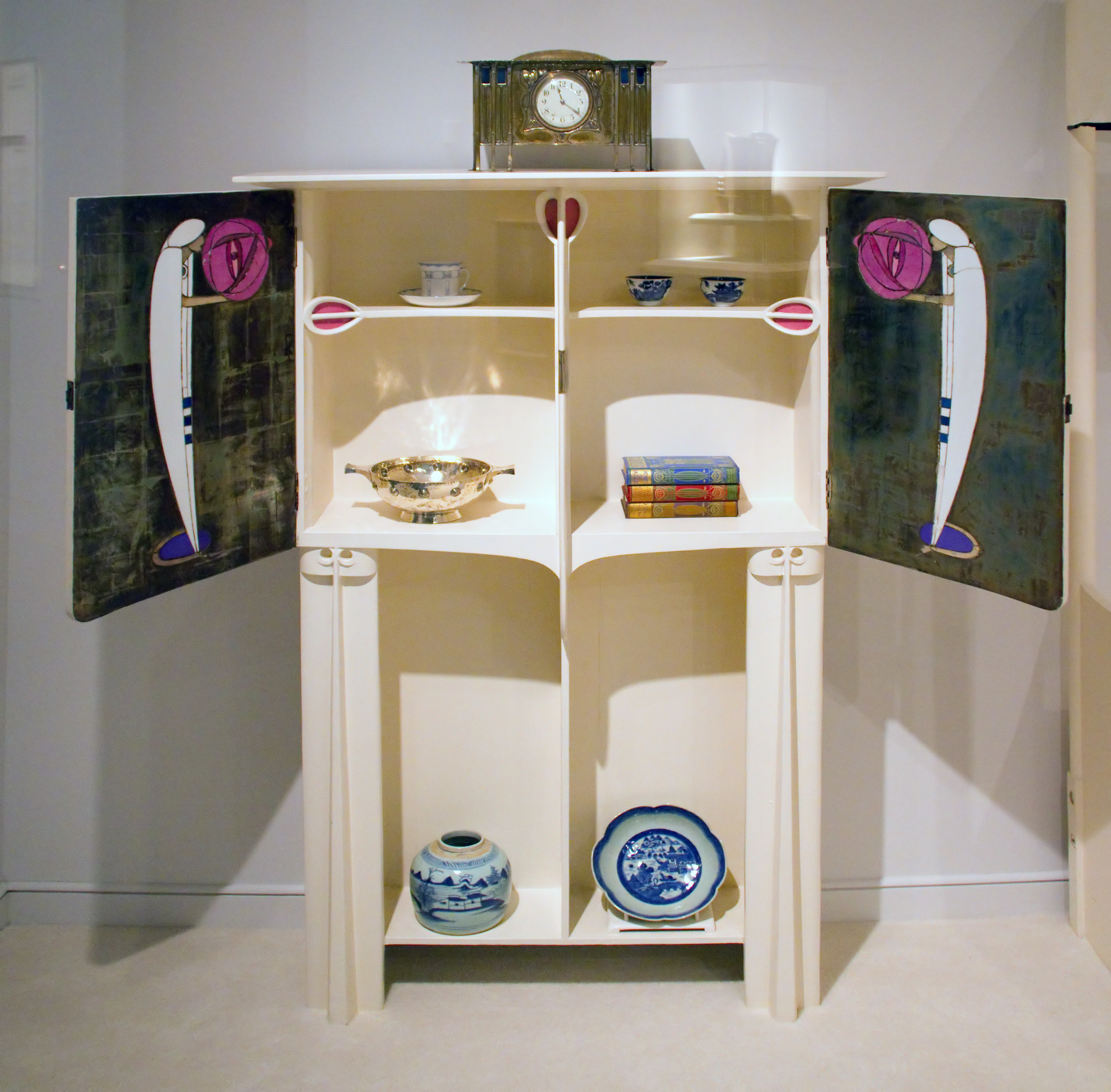
Charles Rennie Mackintosh Cabinet, Royal Ontario Museum

In June 2018, a mural depicting Mackintosh and using elements of his distinctive style was created in Glasgow to honour the 150th anniversary of the artist's birth. It is made by Glasgow street artist, Rogue One and commissioned by the Radisson Red.

From 6 October 2019 – 5 January 2020, the Walters Art Museum exhibited Designing the New: Charles Rennie Mackintosh and the Glasgow Style exploring his work and the artists and craftspeople who worked with him. The exhibit traveled to the Frist Art Museum 11 June–12 September 2021.

From 1986 until 1992, InterCity locomotive 86226 was named Charles Rennie Mackintosh. In March 2018, Virgin Trains West Coast named 390008 Charles Rennie Mackintosh.

== See also ==
- The English House
- List of people on banknotes § Scotland

== Sources ==
- Davidson, Fiona (1998). The Pitkin Guide: Charles Rennie Mackintosh. Great Britain: Pitkin Unichrome. ISBN 0-85372-874-7.
- Fiell, Charlotte and Peter (1995). Charles Rennie Mackintosh. Taschen. ISBN 3-8228-3204-9.
