= Andy MacMillan =

Scottish architect, educator, writer and broadcaster

Andrew MacMillan OBE RSA FRIAS RIBA (11 December 1928, in Maryhill, Glasgow – 16 August 2014, in Inverness) was a Scottish architect, educator, writer and broadcaster. He served as head of the Mackintosh School of Architecture in Glasgow between 1973 and 1994 and was awarded the Royal Society of Arts gold medal (1975) and the inaugural lifetime achievement award of the Royal Incorporation of Architects in Scotland. In 1986 he was Davenport Visiting Professor at Yale University.

MacMillan joined his lifelong friend Isi Metzstein at Gillespie, Kidd & Coia in 1954 and the pair went on to become the firm's lead designers, both becoming partners in the business in 1966.

He was appointed an Officer of the Order of the British Empire in 1992.

National Life Stories conducted an oral history interview (C467/112) with Andy MacMillan in 2013 for its Architects Lives' collection held by the British Library.

== Works ==
- Church of St Paul, Glenrothes, 1957
- Bellshill Maternity Hospital and Nurses Home
- schools in Cumbernauld, Simshill, Langside, Pollock and Glasgow
- St Mary of the Angels, Falkirk
- St Joseph's Church, Duntocher
- St Bride's, East Kilbride
- St Patrick's, Kilsyth
- St Benedict's, Easterhouse
- Our Lady of Good Counsel, Glasgow
- St Peter's Seminary, Cardross, the first modern building to be awarded Category-A listed status
- halls of residence at the University of Hull (1963–7)
- Alterations and additions to Wadham College, Oxford (1971–7)
- Robinson College, Cambridge (1974–80)
- Craobh Haven, Argyll

== Television series ==
- Six Scottish Burghs, Pencil of Light for BBC Scotland, produced and directed by Ken Macgregor

== See also ==
- The Artist's Cottage project
- House for an Art Lover
- Robert Macintyre
