= Robert Macintyre =

Scottish architect (1940–1997)

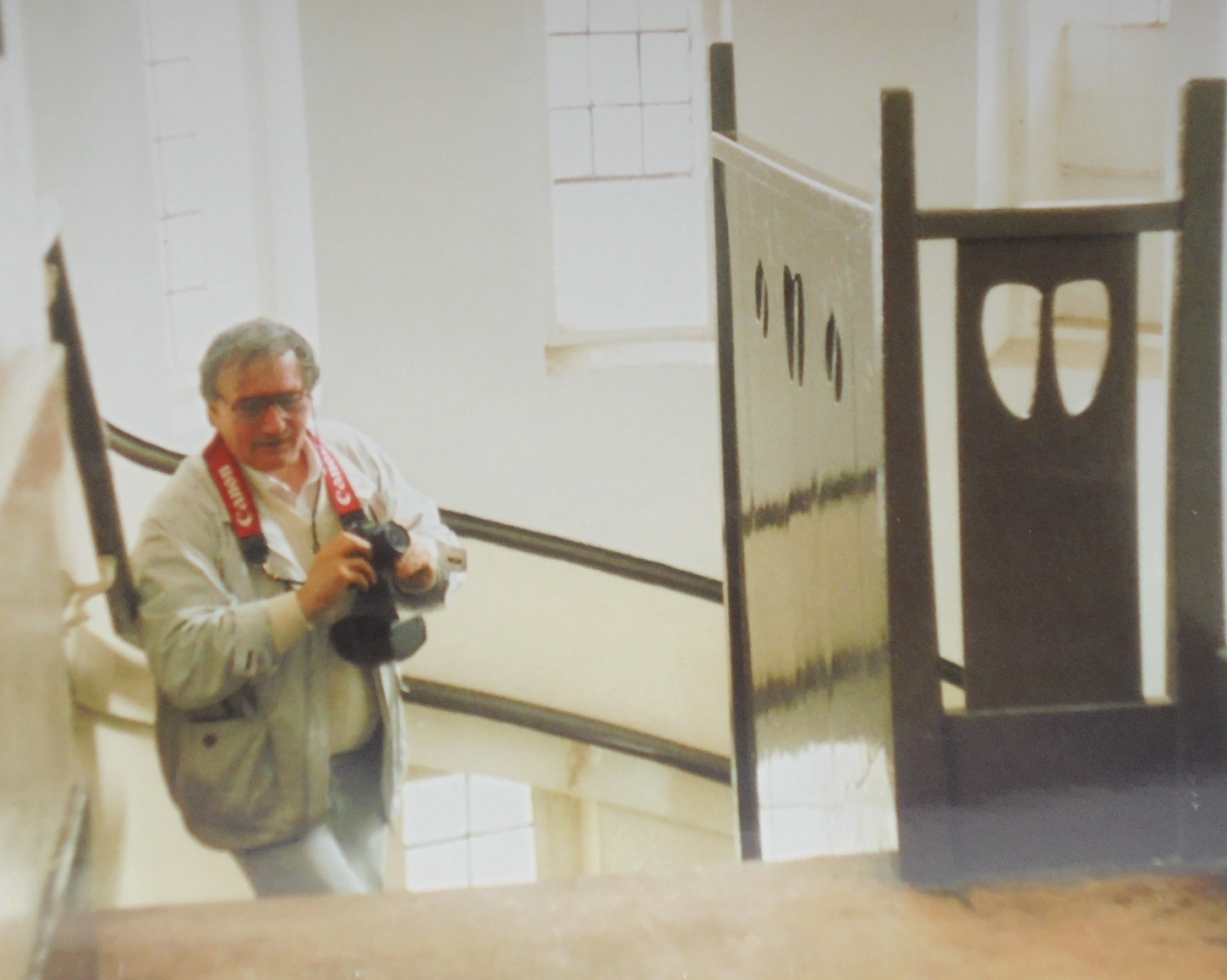
- Robert Macintyre in Ruchill Church Hall, Glasgow. 1989
- Born: 2 February 1940; Glasgow, Scotland
- Died: 18 September 1997 (aged 57)
- Occupation: Architect

Robert Hamilton Macintyre TD RIBA ARIAS (2 February 1940 – 18 September 1997) was a Scottish architect with a particular interest in church architecture and in the work of Charles Rennie Mackintosh. He was a champion of causes to improve the arts facilities and architecture of Inverness, the Highland capital.

== Biography ==
Born 2 February 1940, Glasgow, Scotland, Robert Hamilton Macintyre (Nic) attended the Irvine Royal Academy after his family moved to Kilwinning in Ayrshire. He studied at the University of Strathclyde and at the Mackintosh School of Architecture, Glasgow School of Art.

Macintyre began his career in the Glasgow offices of Keppie, Henderson and Partners, the successors to Charles Rennie Mackintosh's practice. He then joined Gillespie, Kidd and Coia (1966) where he worked alongside Andy MacMillan and Isi Metzstein on St Margaret's RC Church, Clydebank (1970–72). He had a longstanding interest in ecclesiastical architecture with numerous commissions for the RC Diocese of Aberdeen, and later became Diocesan Architect for the Episcopal Diocese of Moray, Ross and Caithness.

Macintyre took a position as architect with John Laing Design Associates (1972) overseeing a housing development in Belfast. He then joined William Holford and Partners (1973), followed by Lobbing and Mullineux (1974), before moving to Inverness to run an office for Parr and Partners (1974). He set up his own practice there in 1978.

In 1990c Macintyre began work on The Artist's Cottage in Farr by Inverness for his clients Peter and Maxine Tovell - the realisation of a speculative drawing, An Artist's Cottage and Studio (1901), by Charles Rennie Mackintosh (CRM). The house was completed in 1992. An account of the project was published by the CRM Society. North House and South House, from CRM's Gate Lodge, Auchinbothie (1901) sketches, were added later.

Macintyre was a founder member of the Inverness Arts Forum and a campaigner in civic redevelopment projects such as Rose Street Hall in Inverness. He worked on these schemes in association with James Steel, an Inverness artist and retired city planner (Halford Associates, Glasgow).

In 1992, Macintyre formed Mackintosh Galleries Ltd, the parent company of the Scottish Fine Art Group, with Peter Tovell and gallery owner, Ken Hardiman, to launch a contentious plan to put CRM's unexecuted A Town House for an Artist (1901) as centrepiece to an arts, heritage and tourist centre for the town. Despite support ("It would be a great shame if such a worthwhile addition to the town were allowed to slip from our grasp," editorial, The Inverness Courier), and sympathetic modifications ("In short, it sounds the sort of environment that would make humans happy and comfortable, improving the quality of life and enhancing the town," editorial, The Inverness Courier), the proposals were rejected.

After Mackintosh Galleries Ltd was dissolved, Macintyre, Tovell and Hardiman continued to support arts events through the Scottish Fine Art Group. In 1993, Macintyre took the post of lecturer in architecture and building science at Inverness College, University of the Highlands and Islands. He served as secretary of the Inverness Architectural Association and as chairman of RIAS Services Ltd. He was a major in the Territorial Army and awarded the Territorial Decoration in 1976. Whilst a student in Glasgow he was an active member of a drama workshop run by fellow students, Alex Gourlay and Bill Bryden, an interest in the performing arts he continued throughout his life. He was a Scout Commissioner and a member of the Inverness Chamber of Commerce.

Macintyre died suddenly on 18 September 1997. His colleague, Hector MacDonald, described him as 'a passionate man (who) did nothing in half measures'.
