= House for an Art Lover =

Architectural structure in Glasgow

Coordinates: 55.84739°N 4.31394°W

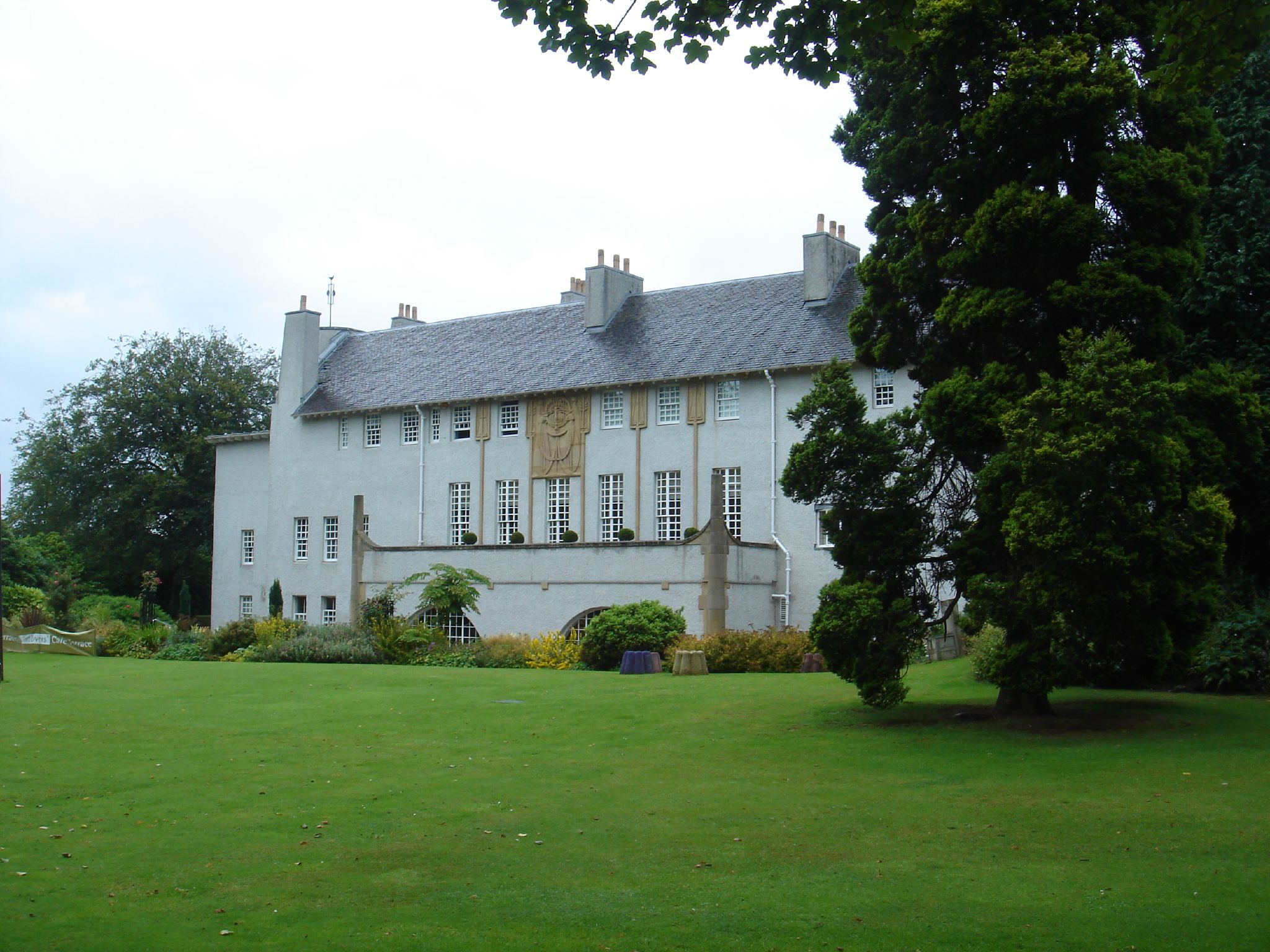
- Interactive map of the House for an Art Lover area

General information
- Type: House
- Architectural style: Art Nouveau
- Location: Glasgow, Scotland
- Construction started: 1989
- Completed: 1996

Design and construction
- Architect: Charles Rennie Mackintosh of initial drawings in 1901

The House for an Art Lover is an arts and cultural centre in Glasgow, Scotland. The building was constructed between 1989 and 1996 based on an original 1901 Art Nouveau house design by Charles Rennie Mackintosh and his wife, Margaret MacDonald. The house is situated in Glasgow's Bellahouston Park, adjacent to Dumbreck, and sits east of the site of the Festival Tower of the Empire Exhibition, Scotland of 1938.

The idea to actually build the house, eight decades later, from the Mackintosh designs of 1901 came from Graham Roxburgh (1936-2023), a consulting structural engineer in Glasgow. Looking for offices for his firm of Roxburgh & Partners, he had bought and rescued Craigie Hall, nearby at Rowan Road, Dumbreck and refurbished its Mackintosh interiors. Planning for the new House began in 1987.

House for an Art Lover is a prominent example of Art Nouveau precursor of the Modern Style. It serves as a venue for art exhibitions and other events, as well as being itself a visitor attraction.

== History ==
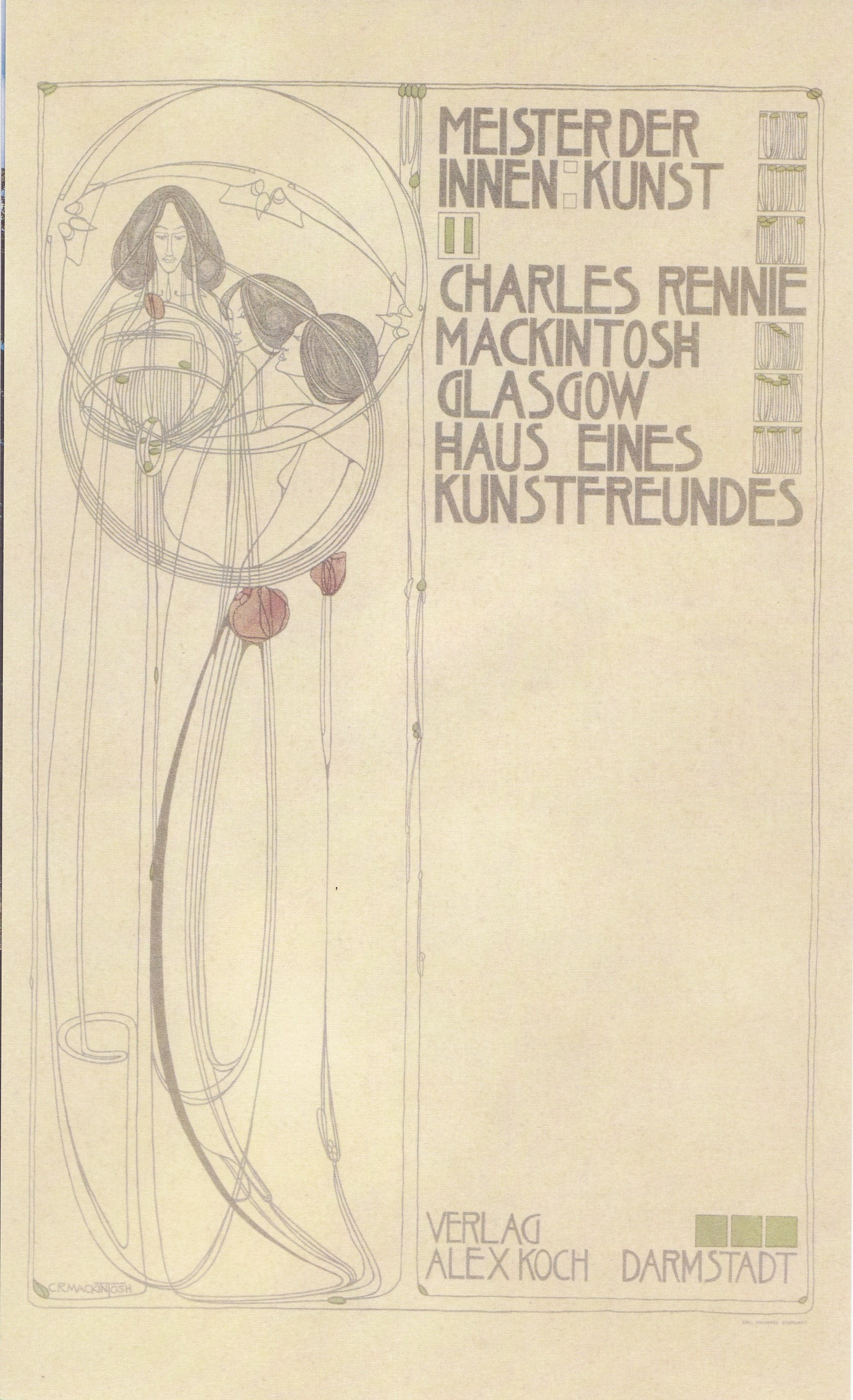
Cover sheet to Mackintosh's competition entry for House of an Art Lover, 1901

The house was originally designed for an open competition for an architectural design of a "Haus eines Kunstfreundes" (Art Lover's House), set by the German design magazine Zeitschrift für Innendekoration published by Alexander Koch. There were thirty six entries from across Europe, including two from Britain. Despite disqualification due to late entry and unfinished sketches, the Mackintosh portfolio of fourteen drawings was awarded a prize for its "pronounced personal quality, novel and austere form and the uniform configuration of interior and exterior". The proposed house, if the German magazine so decided, would have been constructed in Germany. Such house was never built.

Thanks to Roxburgh's inspiration and wide support for his ideas, the Art Lover House began its construction in 1989 with funding from the Scottish Development Agency, Glasgow City Council, Graham Roxburgh and others.

Due to a national recession in the early 1990s, construction had to stop, but restarted in 1994, when Glasgow City Council and the Glasgow School of Art (GSA) provided funds to ensure completion of the interior and landscaping. Mackintosh's original designs were interpreted and realised by John Kane and Graeme Robertson (up to 1990) assisted by Professor Andy MacMillan Head of the Mackintosh School of Architecture at GSA; with contributions by many contemporary artists. GD Lodge & Partners became the succeeding architects from 1994. Original portfolio designs were displayed in each room to allow comparisons.

The House for an Art Lover, is owned and operated by a charitable company of the same name "whose primary purpose is the stimulation of public interest in Art, Design & Architecture. Its remit includes the development of visual art exhibitions by some of Scotland's leading artists and designers in the Cafe Gallery with a related gallery education programme for children and adults." The House has exhibition spaces and is a venue for conferences, functions, concerts and other public and private events. It has office and studio space, a restaurant cafe, and small retailing unit.

== Design and construction ==
As with all of Mackintosh's works, the House is designed to be viewed as a whole. His work incorporated multiple styles and is a compilation of opposites. Inside the house traditional Victorian designs are juxtaposed with modern concepts, and displays the blending of masculine and feminine, natural forms with abstract thought, or simple concepts with complex designs. Mackintosh emphasized a need for architects and designers to be given greater freedom when expressing their ideas; and, this ability to create an independent design is visible in the structure and layout of the House for an Art Lover.

While the House reflects the Mackintosh style, the building is a construction based on drafts produced in 1901. It is an interpretation of the Mackintoshes’ original designs for a house and not for multi-purpose commercial and artistic uses.

== Gallery ==
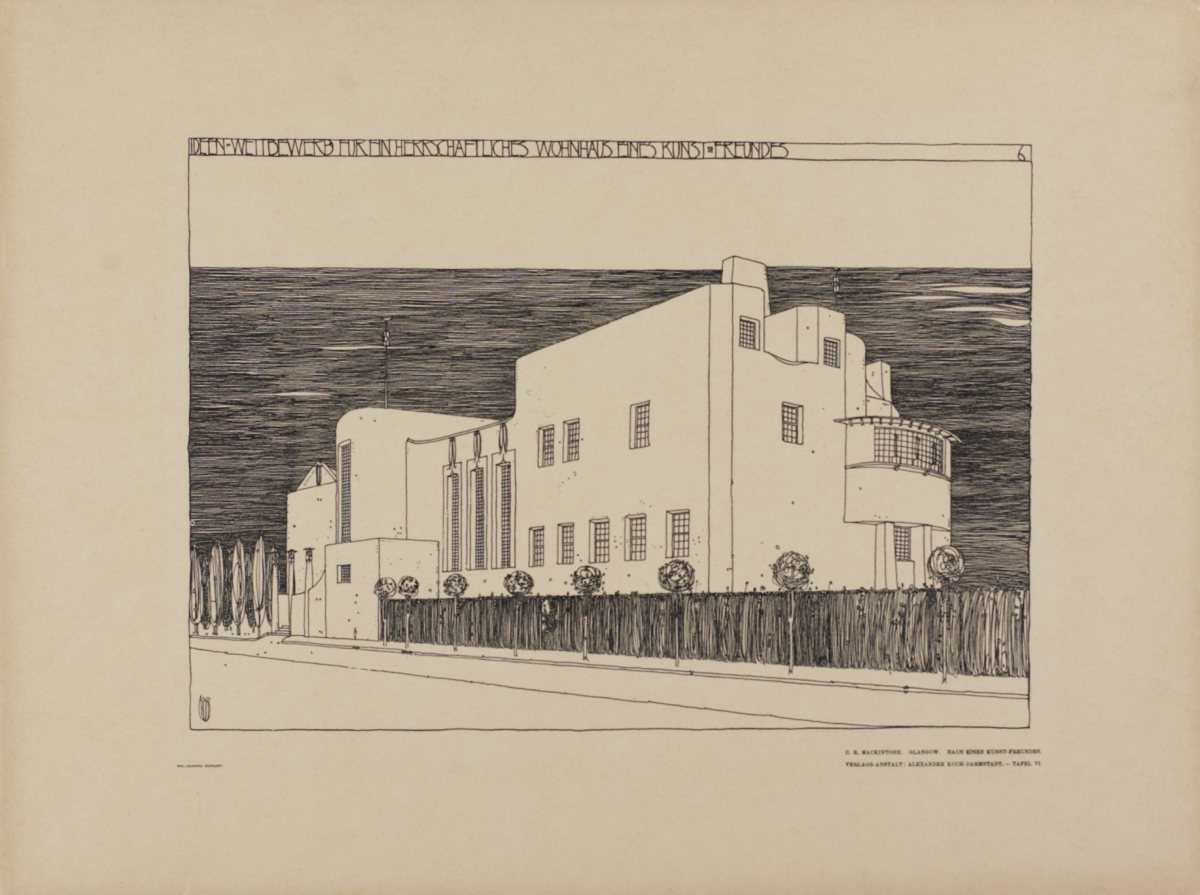
Competition entry drawing of the house from the north west.

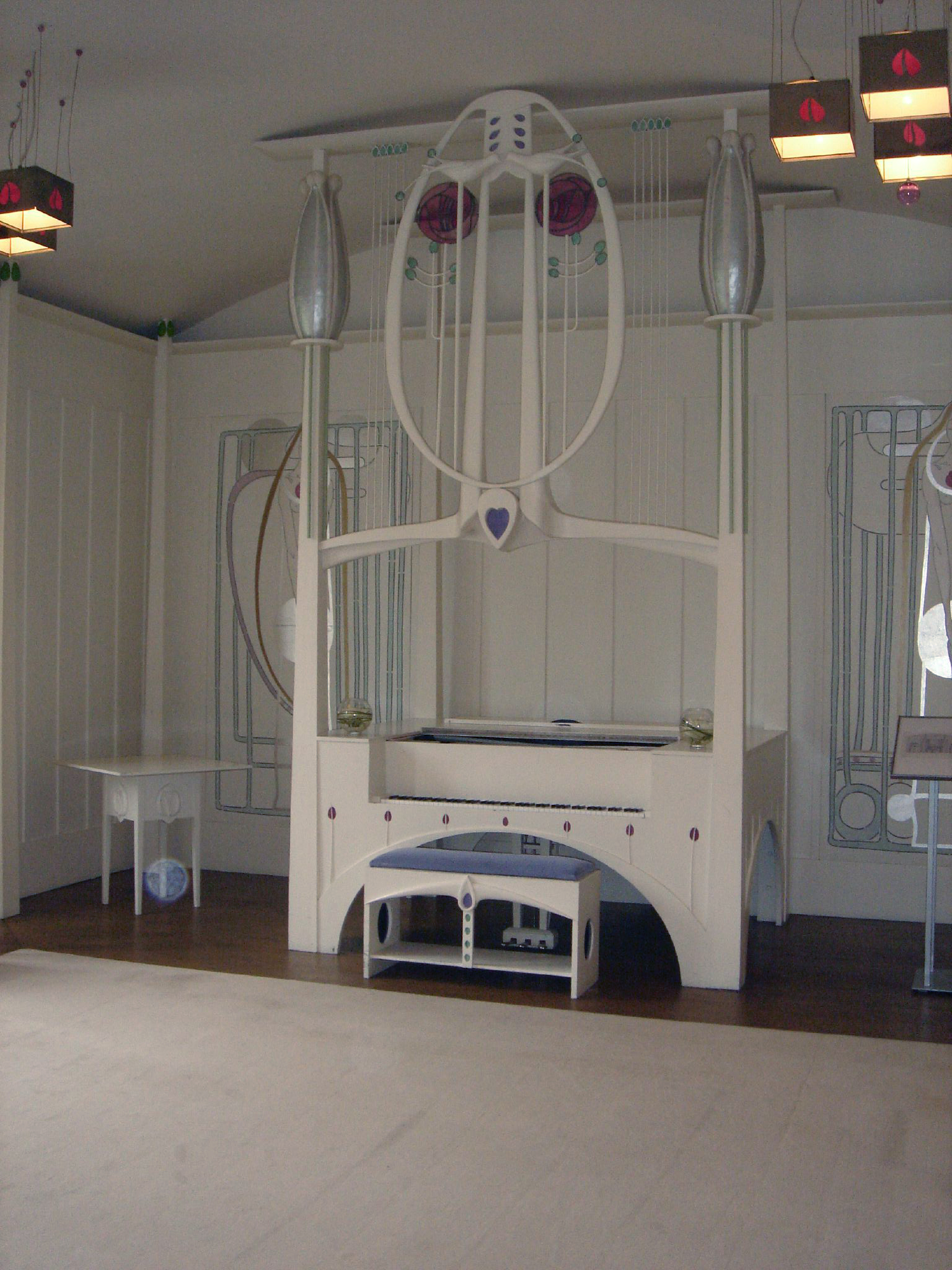
The interior design of House for an Art Lover exemplifies Macintosh's flowing, floral style of design.

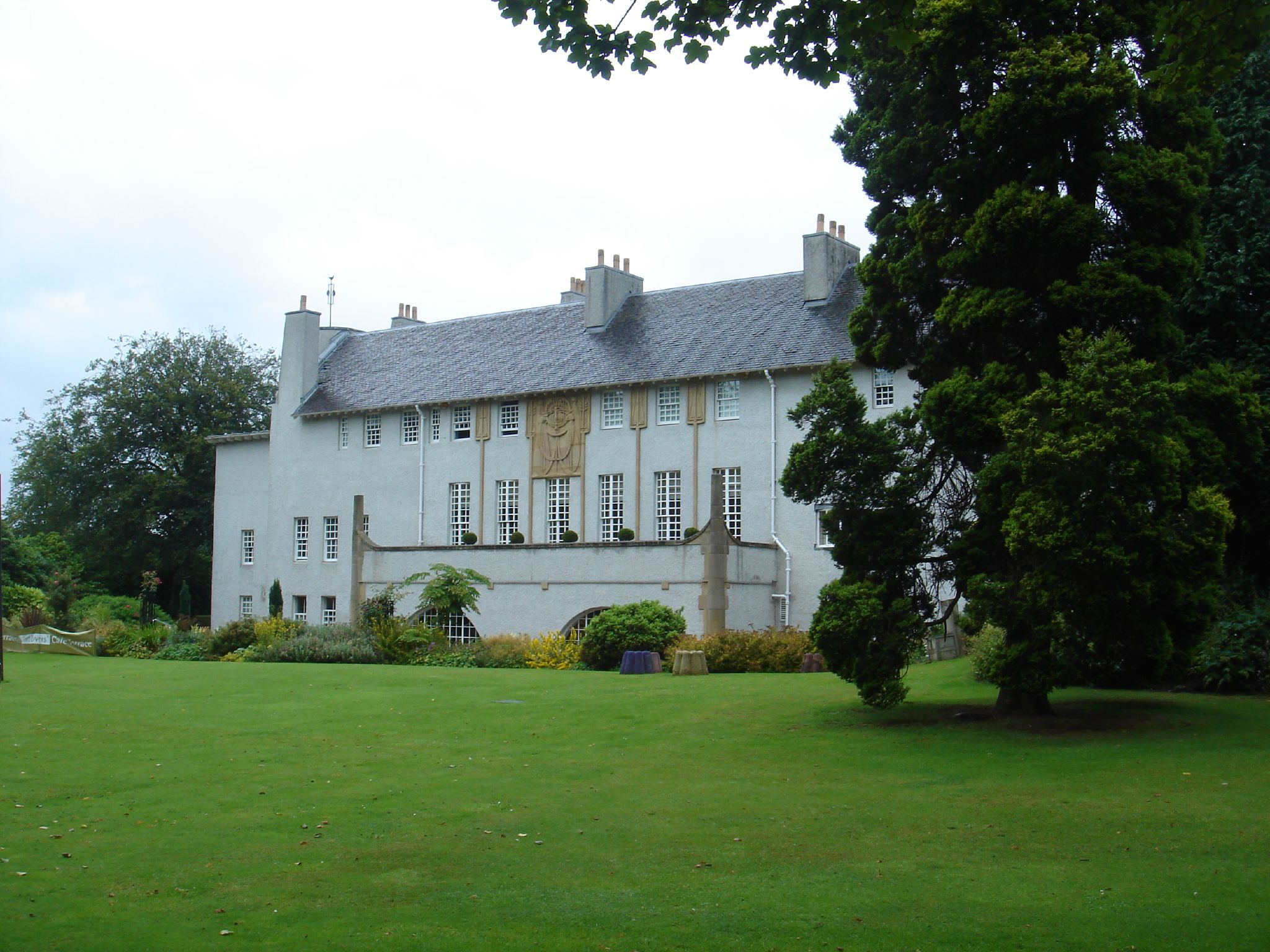
House for an Art Lover is situated in Bellahouston Park, Glasgow.

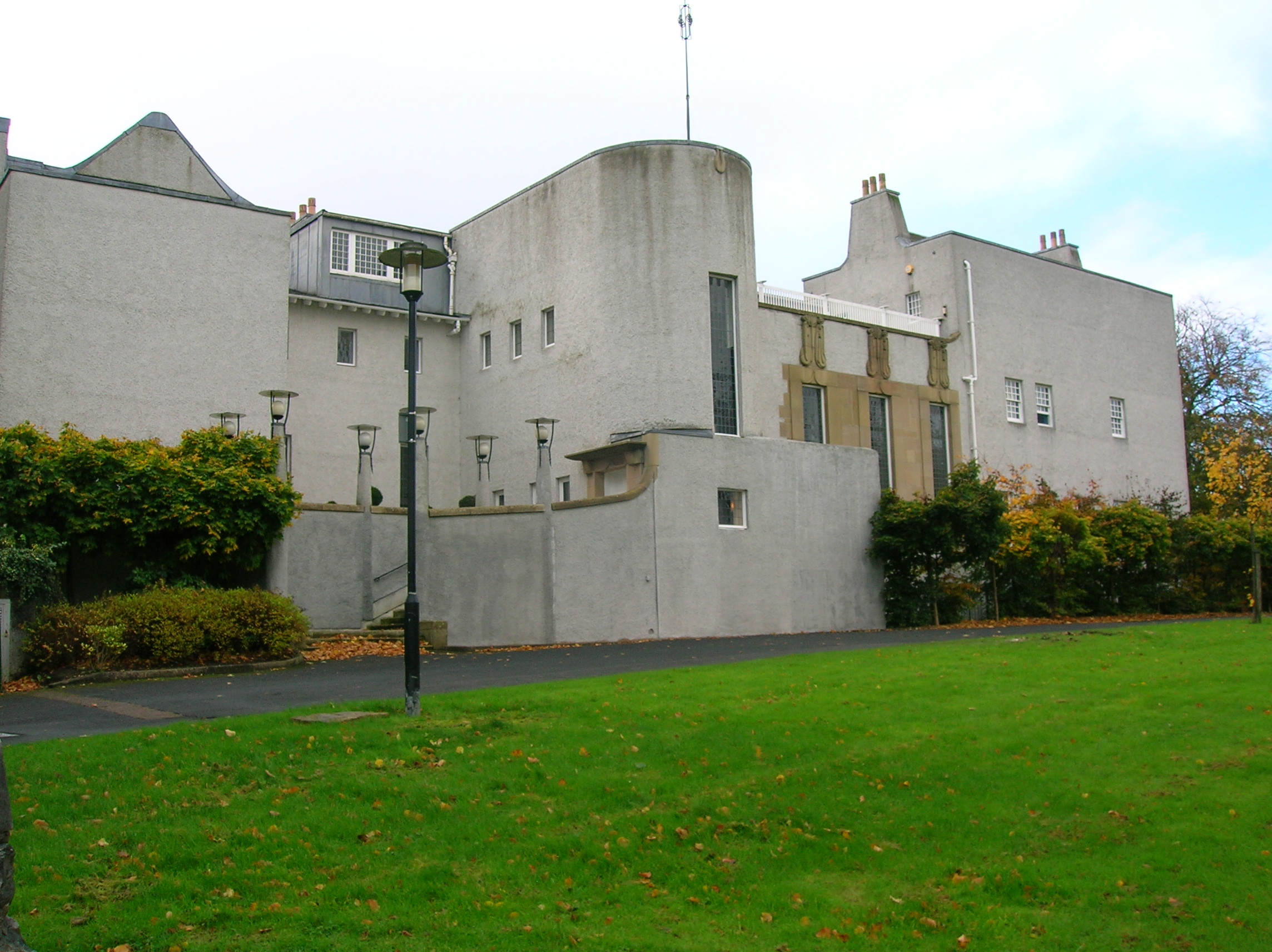
An exterior view overlooking the 'Grounds for Play'.

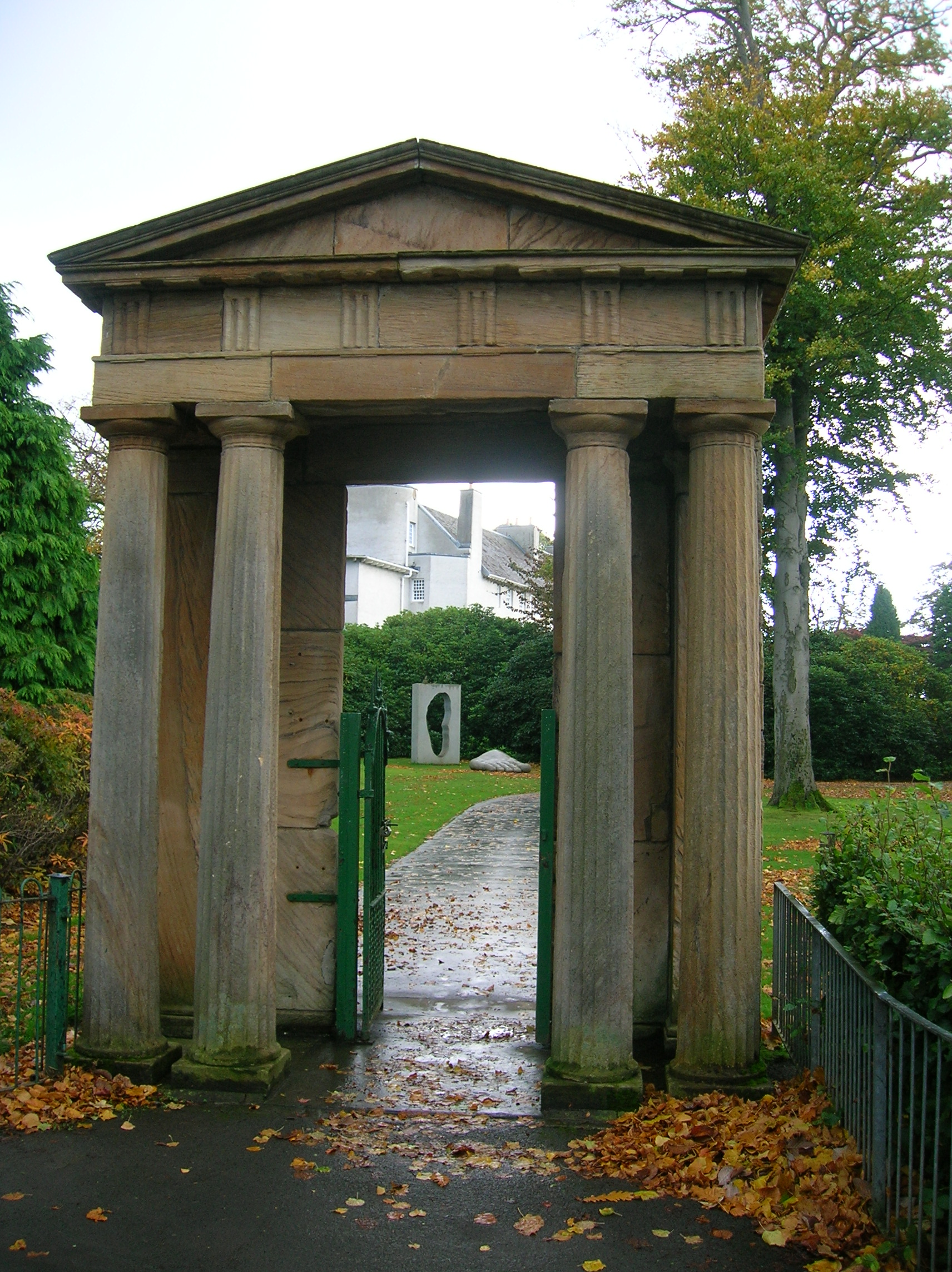
A portico surviving from the old Ibroxhill House which stood on this site. The 'Art Lover' house and the 'Giant Foot' artwork are in the background.

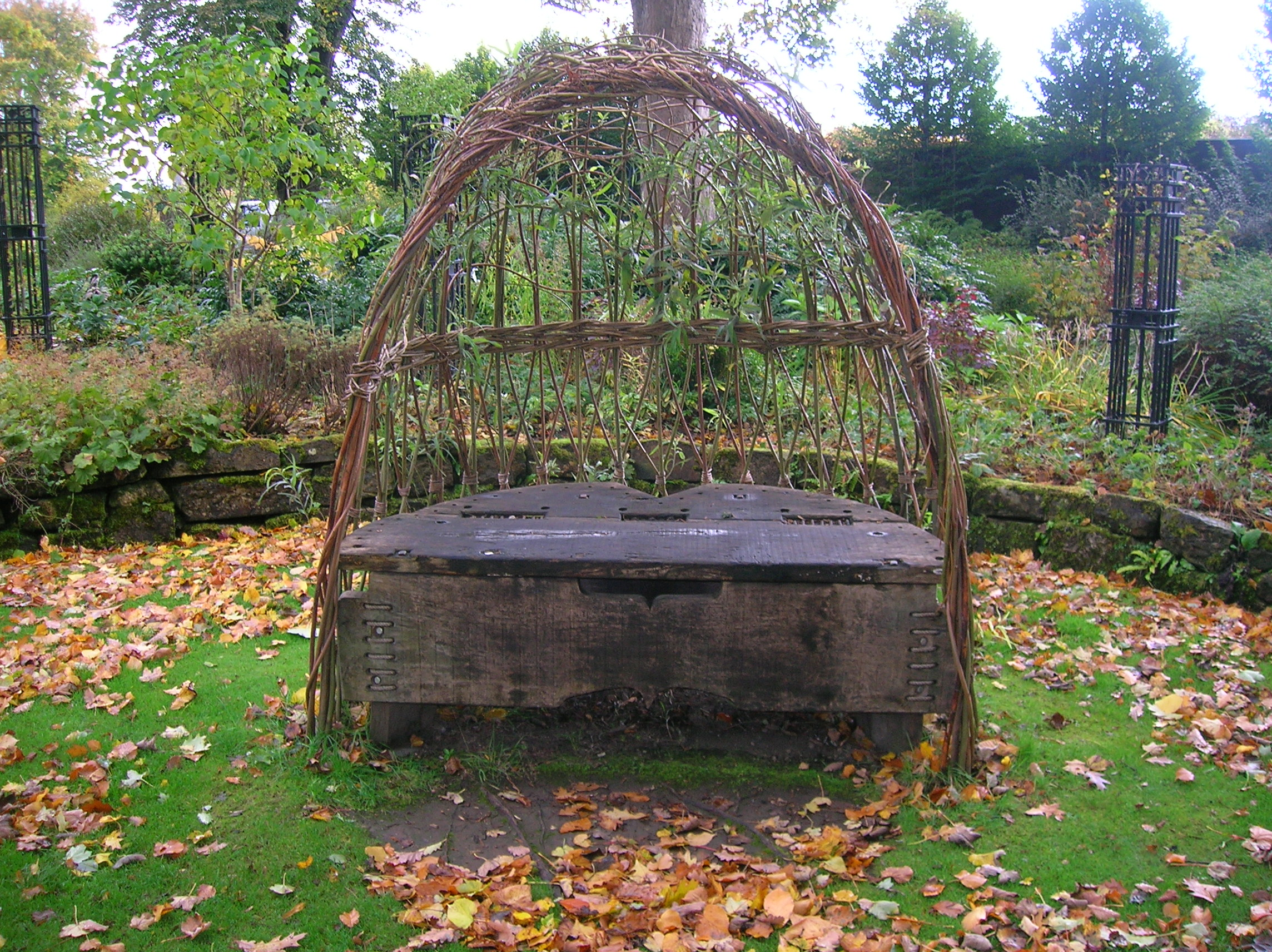
A living willow seat on the lawn outside the house.

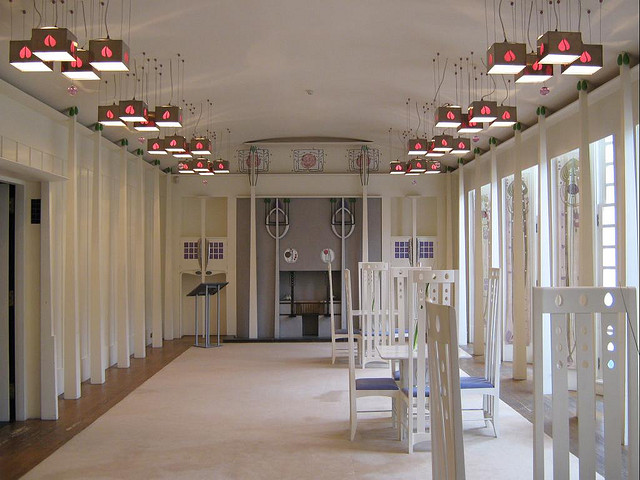
Music room

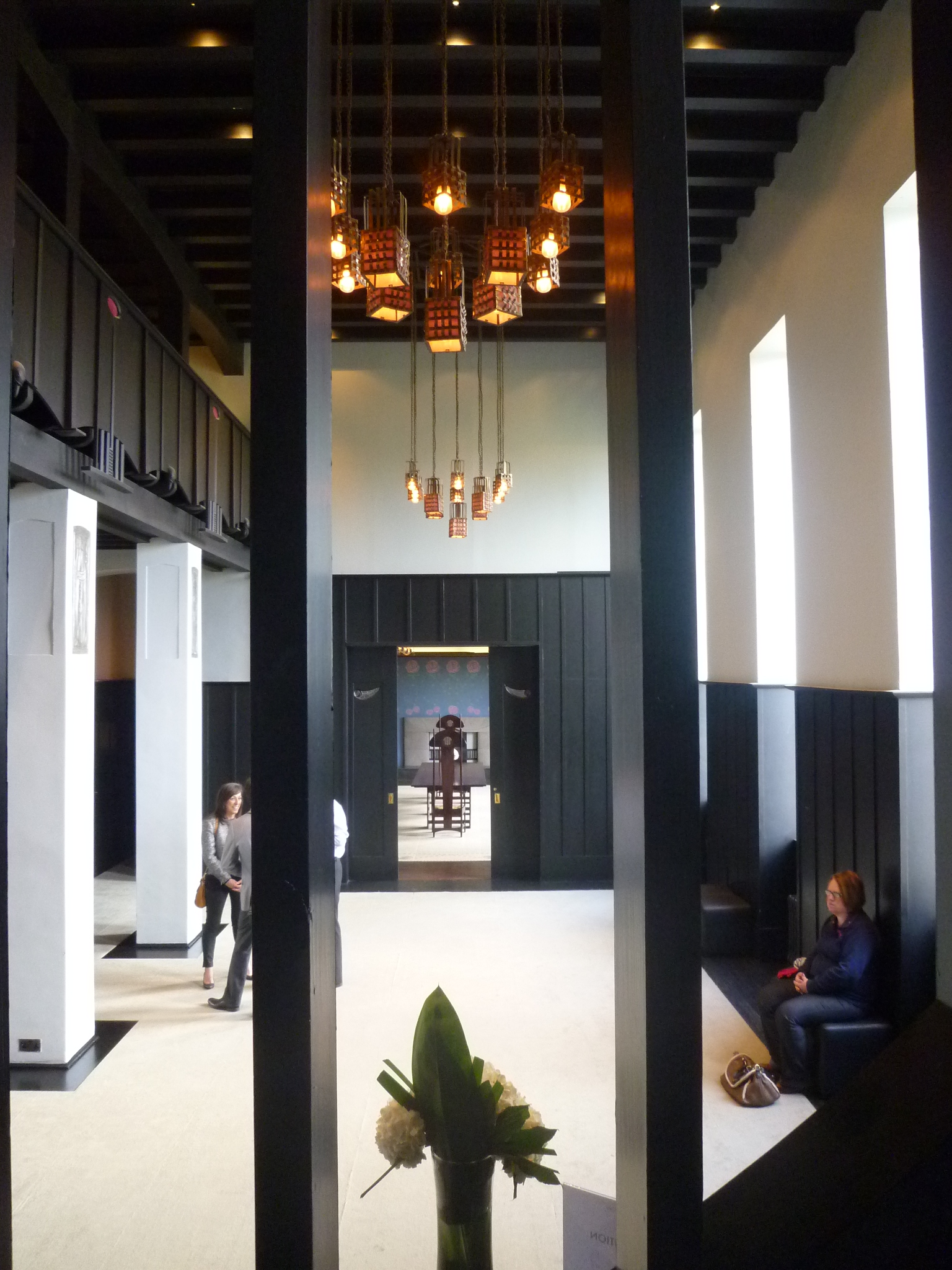
Main hall
