= Robert G. McIntyre =

American politician (1931–1995)

Member of the Missouri House of Representatives

Personal details
- Born: May 25, 1931 St. Louis, Missouri
- Died: October 13, 1995 (aged 64)
- Party: Democratic
- Spouse: Marilyn Jean Tiffany (1951)
- Children: 3
- Occupation: farmer; real estate salesman

Robert G. McIntyre (May 25, 1931 – October 13, 1995) was an American politician who served in the Missouri House of Representatives. He was first elected to the Missouri House of Representatives in 1974. He graduated from Herculaneum High School in 1949.
