= Mackintosh School of Architecture =

Mackintosh School of Architecture, The Glasgow School of Art
- Type: Architecture school
- Affiliations: Glasgow School of Art, University of Glasgow
- Head: Sally Stewart
- Students: c. 450
- Location: Glasgow, Scotland
- Campus: Garnethill, Glasgow
- Director: Penny Macbeth
- Website: www.gsa.ac.uk/architecture

The Mackintosh School of Architecture (MSA) is one of the five schools which make up the Glasgow School of Art, situated in the Garnethill area of Glasgow, Scotland. The Mackintosh School of Architecture is the Glasgow School of Art's only academic school concerned with a single discipline.

The school is based in the Bourdon Building, named after the French architect Eugene Bourdon, the first Professor of Architecture at the Glasgow School of Art.

== History ==
Architecture has been a part of the teaching at the GSA from the middle of the 19th century which was combined with the Glasgow School of Architecture at the Royal Technical College. In 1964 this arrangement was severed by the professors at the Royal Technical College (when the University of Strathclyde was given Royal Charter) and it was at this point that the Mackintosh School of Architecture was created. They taught on a part-time basis until 1968, the School boasts two of Glasgow's most notable modern architects, Andy MacMillan and Isi Metzstein of the architectural practice Gillespie, Kidd & Coia, amongst its most eminent alumni.

Since 1968, the programmes have been predominantly for full-time students, but it continues to be Scotland's only school of architecture to offer part-time mode of study.

== Notable graduates ==
- Gareth Hoskins
- Andy MacMillan
- Isi Metzstein
- Alan Dunlop
- James Gowan
- Andrew Whalley
