= Glasgow Precision Oncology Laboratory =

The University of Glasgow's Glasgow Precision Oncology Laboratory (GPOL) is a molecular research facility that partners with the NHS and industry to perform research into the development of novel therapeutic strategies, the creation of pan-cancer genomic assays and provide knowledge transfer for healthcare systems to enable them to develop landscapes for therapeutic testing in cancer.

GPOL's integrated structure is designed to take scientific ideas through preclinical studies to translation into the clinic. GPOL combines research expertise in targeted capture and whole-genome sequencing, cancer bioinformatics and the development of patient pathways in precision oncology in routine healthcare.

GPOL performs tests for discovery work on patient tumours, including whole-genome sequencing and RNA-seq, and experiments to understand models of disease, particularly genetically engineered mouse models, by defining their genomic mutational landscapes and transcriptome, and providing molecular phenotypes for clinical trials development in oncology.

GPOL uses international data, including that collected by the International Cancer Genome Consortium (ICGC), The Cancer Genome Atlas and Pan-Cancer Analysis of Whole Genomes (PCAWG), to create the suite of Glasgow Cancer Assays (also known as the Glasgow Cancer Test and the Clinical Cancer Genome) – standardised pan-cancer assays covering adult solid tumours and haematological cancers for use by healthcare systems and researchers worldwide.

The Glasgow Cancer Assays are currently in use for testing patients for clinical trials but, with the aim of incorporating the test in routine healthcare as part of a learning healthcare system (LHS,) are being evaluated by the UK's NHS and a network of cancer centres in Italy. The Glasgow Cancer Assays are licensed to Agilent Technologies on a non-exclusive basis for global distribution for research.

== History ==
In 2015, pancreatic cancer surgeon-scientist Professor Andrew Biankin AO was appointed Regius Surgeon and Director of the Wolfson Wohl Cancer Research Centre, part of the Institute of Cancer Sciences at the University of Glasgow. He is Director of the Glasgow Precision Oncology Laboratory and executive director and Chairman of the International Cancer Genome Consortium (from 2018).

In 2016 Professor Biankin established the Glasgow Precision Oncology Laboratory (GPOL) at the University of Glasgow to enable translational cancer research and to advance novel therapeutic strategies for cancer for academic research and industry. GPOL is located at the Wolfson Wohl Cancer Research Centre at the University of Glasgow Garscube campus, with both wet and dry labs and a high-performance compute cluster. There is close collaboration with the CRUK Beatson Institute.

GPOL's purpose-built capacity, expertise, infrastructure and resources are designed to accelerate therapeutic development from discovery through to preclinical development and clinical implementation.

GPOL's capabilities were first used to support the Precision-Panc pancreatic cancer clinical trials with the development of a genomic test panel for screening patients in 2017.

== GPOL divisions and activities ==
Candidate molecular processes are identified in the Therapeutic Development Division, led by Professor Biankin, where model systems are used extensively to test for efficacy of therapeutics, while looking for signals that include tumour response and survival.

When a preclinical platform of evidence is compelling enough to support testing in the clinic, it moves into the Clinical Development Division, led by Dr David Chang, for testing in clinical trials.

The Medical Genomics Division, led by GPOL's Deputy Director, Dr Susanna Cooke, develop methods for picking up the same signals in patients and deliver molecular profiling for clinical trials.
