= Beatson West of Scotland Cancer Centre =

Specialised cancer care centre in Glasgow, Scotland

- NHS Greater Glasgow and Clyde
- Main entrance of the Beatson West of Scotland Cancer Centre in May 2007

- Location within Glasgow council area

Geography
- Location: 1053 Great Western Road, Glasgow, Scotland, United Kingdom
- Coordinates: 55.88176°N 4.31316°W

Organisation
- Care system: NHS Scotland
- Type: Specialist

Services
- Beds: 146
- Speciality: Oncology and clinical haematology

History
- Former name: Beatson Oncology Centre
- Founded: 1886
- Opened: 2007

Links
- Website: www.beatson.scot.nhs.uk
- Lists: Hospitals in Scotland
- Other links: List of hospitals in Scotland

The Beatson West of Scotland Cancer Centre (BWoSCC) is a specialist cancer centre on the Gartnavel Hospitals campus in Glasgow, Scotland. Operated by NHS Greater Glasgow and Clyde, it is the lead centre for non-surgical cancer care in the West of Scotland, providing specialist oncology and clinical haematology services to a catchment population of about 2.5 million people.

The centre has 146 inpatient beds, 48 chemotherapy stations and 12 linear accelerators for radiotherapy. The present purpose-built centre began operating at Gartnavel in 2007 and was formally opened in February 2008, succeeding the Beatson Oncology Centre at the Western Infirmary. The service traces its origins to the Glasgow Cancer and Skin Hospital, established in 1886, and takes its name from the surgeon Sir George Beatson.

== History ==
The hospital has its origins in the Glasgow Cancer and Skin Institution which was founded in 1886 and later renamed after its first director of cancer services, Sir George Beatson.

== Support ==
The BWoSCC was supported by charities Friends of the Beatson and The Beatson Oncology Centre Fund. In 2014 through a restructuring, and in partnership with NHS Greater Glasgow and Clyde, the resources of both charities dedicated to supporting the Beatson West of Scotland Cancer Centre have combined to form a unitary charity to support and serve the Beatson. The charity is named Beatson Cancer Charity.

== Notable present or former physicians ==
Notable present or former physicians include:

- Colonel Sir George Beatson, KCB, KBE, DL
- Professor Sir Kenneth Calman, KCB, DL, FRSE
- Professor Gordon McVie
- Professor David Kerr, CBE
- Professor Ann Barrett, OBE.
- Dr Hosney Yosef, OBE

== Notable present or former scientists ==
Notable present or former scientists include:

- Lord Fleck, KBE, FRS
- Air Marshal Sir Harold Whittingham, KCB, KBE
- Professor Allan Balmain, FRS, FRSE
- Professor Margaret Frame, OBE, FRSE
- Professor Paul Workman, FRS
- Professor Karen Vousden, CBE, FRS, FRSE

== See also ==
- Cancer in the United Kingdom
