= David George (surgeon) =

British breast cancer researcher

William David George CBE (March 1943 – 6 April 2023) was a British surgeon and breast cancer researcher.

== Biography ==
Born in Reading, Berkshire, George was educated at Henley Grammar School.

George began his career in 1973 as a lecturer at the University of Manchester. In 1981, he became a general surgeon at the Western Infirmary in Reading.

By 1990, George shifted his focus to improving breast cancer survival rates through diagnostic procedures. He implemented a diagnostic method that allowed patients to complete all necessary diagnostic tests for breast lumps within a day, as opposed to the traditional multi-week process. In the same year, he helped establish a Surgical Forum which gathered surgeons in Glasgow to exchange medical practices.

In 2000, George assumed the Regius Chair of Surgery at the University of Glasgow. He also held leadership positions in several professional organisations, including presidencies at the British Association of Surgical Oncology and the Surgical Research Society of Great Britain and Ireland. Additionally, he served as chairman for the British Breast Group and the West of Scotland Managed Clinical Network for Breast Cancer.

In 2008, George was awarded a CBE for his services to medicine and healthcare, recognising his contributions, including his advocacy for early-stage breast cancer detection.

=== Death ===
He died, aged 80, in April 2023 and was survived by a wife, four children and two step-children.

Academic offices
Preceded by Sir Andrew Kay	Regius Professor of Surgery (University of Glasgow); 1999–2013	Succeeded by Andrew Biankin
