= Allan Burns (surgeon) =

Allan Burns (18 September 1781 – 22 June 1813) was a Scottish surgeon and physician. A lecturer on surgery and anatomy at Glasgow, he studied medicine in Glasgow. He visited Russia in 1804 and he published anatomical treatises. He was the son of Revd Dr John Burns, a minister of the Barony Church, and Elizabeth Stevenson. Of his brothers, Dr John Burns (1775–1850) became Regius Professor of Surgery at the University of Glasgow; James was a shipowner and George was his partner in G & J Burns.

Allan Burns commenced medical study at fourteen under his brother, John Burns. In 1804 he went to London to seek medical service in the army, and was induced to go to St. Petersburg to take charge of a hospital about to be established by the Empress Catherine on the English plan; but finding the position uncongenial, he returned to Scotland in a few months. He had taken the position for a three-month trial, and very early he 'got into a scrape' for dissecting a Russian, whom he decapitated, and a German. The removal of any body parts was then prohibited, unless they were Tartars or Jews. He had failed to make arrangements for a salary, and on discovering that government surgeons were paid £90, he returned to Scotland, where he became a highly popular lecturer on anatomy—wearing the diamond and topaz ring given to him by the Empress Catherine when he left Russia. Burns then established himself as a lecturer on anatomy and surgery at Glasgow, his brother having given up his lectures on anatomy, owing to a body-snatching scandal. He attained very considerable success, being both vivid in illustration and accurate in knowledge. Allan authored a number of publications which were quickly translated into German and were published concurrently in the United States. He also published papers in the Edinburgh Medical and Surgical Journal. His work on vascular pressure systems and on heart disease were seen as pioneering and were long in print. In 1809 he published Observations on Diseases of the Heart, and in 1812 Observations on the Surgical Anatomy of the Head and Neck. In the latter, he provides with James Wardrop the first description of what is now considered to be a uveal melanoma that later metastasized to the liver.

From 1810 his health began to fail, and his promising career was cut short by his death on 22 June 1813. His favourite pupil, Granville Sharp Pattison, has a short memoir of him, prefixed to an addition of some of his writings, which were translated for text-books on the Continent. He was himself a favourite pupil of Sir Astley Cooper's. Allan and his brother, John, built up a considerable museum which provided material for teaching. The museum was eventually bought by Granville Sharp Pattison and some of the exhibits found their way to Philadelphia.
