= James Burns (Scottish shipowner) =

Scottish shipowner (1789-1871)

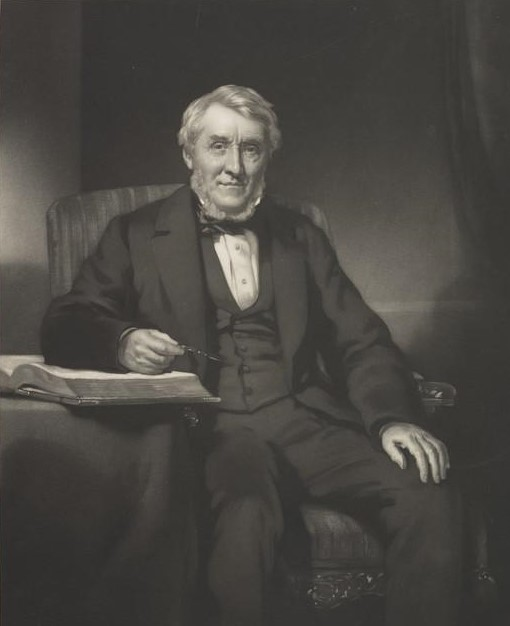
- James Burns
- Born: June 1789
- Died: September 1871 (aged 82)
- Occupation: shipowner

James Burns (9 June 1789 – 6 September 1871), was a shipowner born in Glasgow.

== Family ==
Burns was the third son of the Revd Dr John Burns (1744–1839), minister of the Barony parish of Glasgow, and his wife, Elizabeth, née Stevenson. His eldest brother, Dr John Burns FRS, became the first professor of surgery in the University of Glasgow, and his second brother, Allan Burns, became physician to the empress of Russia at St Petersburg.

Burns was married twice: first, to Margaret Smith and, second, to Margaret Shortridge, who predeceased him. With Margaret Shortridge he had one son, John William Burns, who became a member of the Faculty of Advocates, and succeeded to his father's estates in 1871.

== Shipping ==
Unlike his older brothers, James Burns turned to commerce, and was joined by his younger brother, Sir George Burns, 1st Baronet (1795–1890), in 1818, setting up as J. & G. Burns, general merchants in Glasgow. After six years, the two brothers moved into shipping, joining with Hugh Mathie of Liverpool to establish a small shipping line of six sailing vessels plying between the two ports. The Clyde was then the leading waterway for steam navigation; within a year James and George Burns had ordered their first steamer, and they quickly replaced all their sail ships by steamboats. While George was mainly interested in the technical aspects of the ships, it was James who was the chief commercial influence in the business, supervising the day-to-day transactions, the negotiation of cargoes and contracts.

The Mathie connection with Liverpool was replaced in 1830 by a new arrangement with two Liverpool-based Scots, David and Charles MacIver, to form the Glasgow Steam Packet Company. This arrangement allowed James and George Burns to extend their steamship business to Londonderry, Larne, and Belfast. As before, George concentrated on the shipping department, while James was mainly responsible for the mercantile side of the business.

While the Irish Sea trade was their first and main business, two other avenues opened up to James and George Burns. In 1839 the Liverpool connection was greatly strengthened when George Burns was introduced to Samuel Cunard and raised £270,000 in subscriptions to establish the British and North American Royal Mail Steam Packet Company. This company secured a seven-year contract from the Admiralty to carry the American mails by steamship. James and George, with the MacIvers, were founding partners and shareholders with Cunard in the new venture. While this took George's attention south to Liverpool, James concentrated on the Glasgow business, and in 1845 G. and J. Burns acquired an interest in the developing west highland steamer services by purchasing the Castle Line. This however was quickly re-sold to their nephew David Macbrayne, their shipping clerk David Hutcheson, and his brother Alexander.

== Later life and death ==
He retired from active business and developed an interest in estate improvement, acquiring the estates of Kilmahew, Cumbernauld, and Bloomhall in Dunbartonshire. He spent much time on improvements and was a liberal supporter of religious and philanthropic enterprises. He died on 6 September 1871 at Kilmahew Castle, Cardross, Dumbarton, and was succeeded in his estates by his only son, John Burns.
