= Fiona Watt =

British scientist

Fiona Watt FRS FMedSci
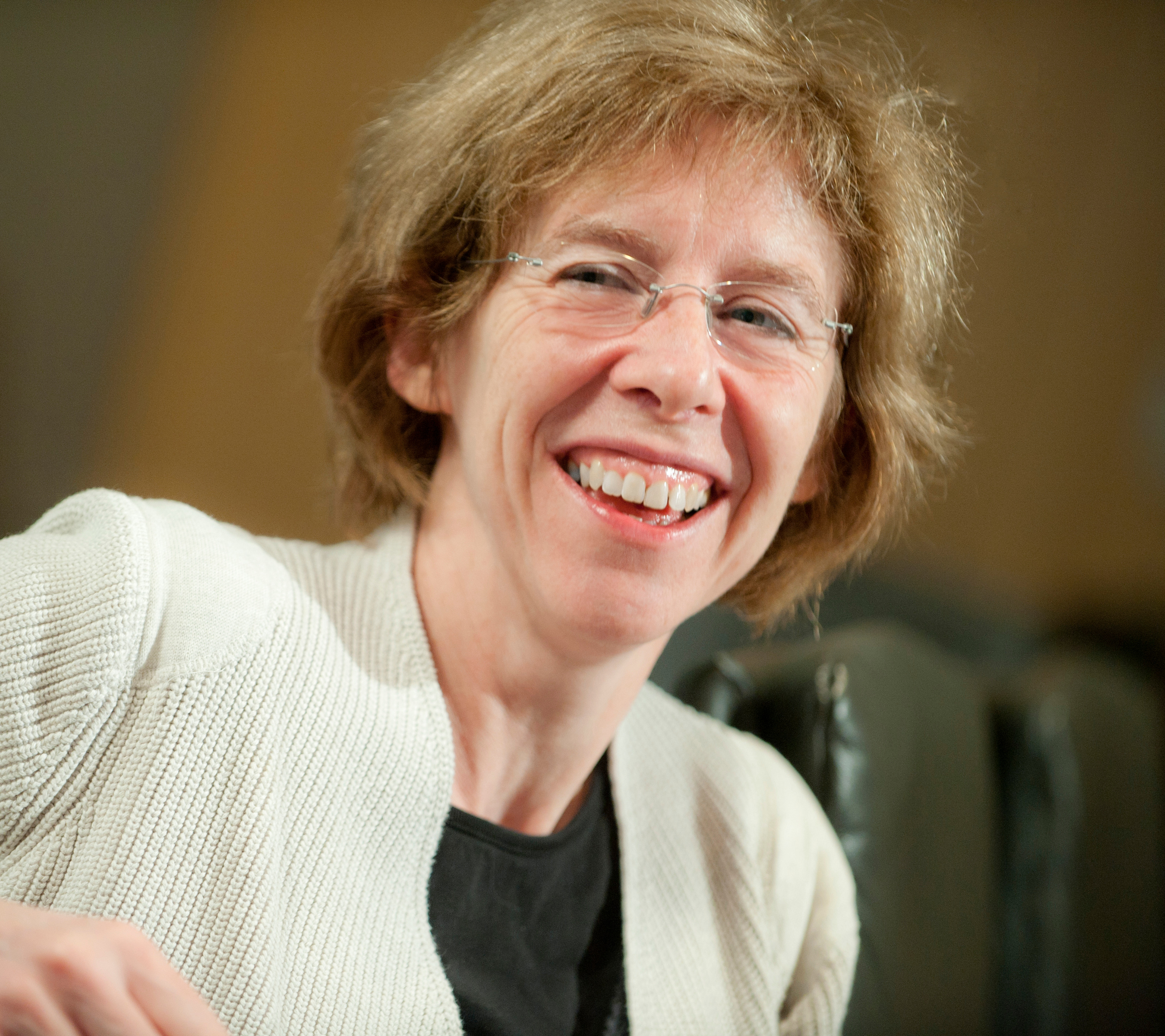
- Born: 28 March 1956
- Education: University of Oxford, University of Cambridge
- Employer: European Molecular Biology Organization (2022–); King's College London (–2022)
- Spouse(s): Jim Cuthbert Smith
- Awards: Fellow of the Royal Society (2003); Fellow of the Academy of Medical Sciences (2000); Royal Society Wolfson Fellowship; EMBO Membership (1999); Suffrage Science award (2011)
- Website: www.wattlab.org

Fiona Watt, FRS FMedSci (born 28 March 1956) is a British scientist who is internationally known for her contributions to the field of stem cell biology. In the 1980s, when the field was in its infancy, she highlighted key characteristics of stem cells and their environment that laid the foundation for much present day research.

Watt is the Director of the European Molecular Biology Organization (EMBO). She previously served as director of the Centre for Stem Cells & Regenerative Medicine at King's College London, and executive chair of the Medical Research Council (United Kingdom) (MRC), becoming the first woman to lead the MRC since its foundation in 1913.

== Early life and education ==
Watt was born on 28 March 1956 in Edinburgh, Scotland. Her father was a dental surgeon who combined his clinical work with an active research programme. Her family were members of the Church of Scotland. Her younger sister, Wendy, died in 1982. Watt knew she wanted to be a scientist from a very young age.

Watt obtained her Bachelor of Arts degree in Natural Sciences in 1976, and her master's degree in 1979, both at Murray Edwards College, University of Cambridge. She also obtained her Doctor of Philosophy degree from the Sir William Dunn School of Pathology, University of Oxford in 1979, supervised by Henry Harris with a thesis on Microtubule-organizing centres in cells in culture and in hybrids derived from them.

== Career ==
After her PhD, Watt completed a two-year postdoctoral research at the Massachusetts Institute of Technology (MIT), US, with Dr. Howard Green. Upon returning to the UK, she founded her first lab at the Kennedy Institute of Rheumatology in London where she became Head of the Molecular Cell Biology Laboratory. In 1987 she relocated to the Cancer Research UK London Research Institute (now part of the Francis Crick Institute) where she served as Head of the Keratinocyte Laboratory. From 2007 to 2012 she worked in Cambridge, where she helped to establish the Cambridge Cancer Research UK Institute and the Wellcome Trust Centre for Stem Cell Research (now the Cambridge Stem Cell Institute). She was a Fellow of St John’s College and the first Herchel Smith Professor of Molecular Genetics at Cambridge University.

=== Research ===
Watt’s major research contribution has been to elucidate how the outer covering of mammalian skin, the epidermis, is maintained through self-renewal of stem cells and terminal differentiation of their progeny. Using cultured human epidermis and genetically modified mice, she pioneered the identification of stem cell populations and elucidated the roles of integrin, Notch, Wnt and receptor tyrosine kinase signalling in regulating their behavior. She identified the first marker, integrin extracellular matrix (ECM) receptors, that could be used to isolate epidermal stem cells – researchers have subsequently found that this marker enriches for stem cells in a wide range of tissues. In addition, others have amply confirmed her original concept that the ECM is a key component of the stem cell niche.

Her lab's research has also shown that the interplay between diverse intrinsic and extrinsic signals is central to determining cell fate, identified different sensing mechanisms and downstream signalling pathways, and elucidated the nature of the switch between stem cells and differentiated cells.

A pioneer of single cell gene expression profiling, she demonstrated that different human epidermal stem cell states are not stochastic but reflect the existence of stem cell subpopulations that had not been identified previously. By demonstrating the existence of functionally distinct skin fibroblast lineages she has opened the way for new strategies to treat scarring and fibrosis.

Watt’s work has resulted in new insights into how epidermal deregulation leads to tumor formation, including the roles played by differentiated cells, bacteria and immune cells. She uncovered new mechanisms by which integrins contribute to cancer, including the first tumour-associated integrin mutation. She also identified the first Wnt-inhibitory mutation that stimulates tumour formation. The generality of her observations has been confirmed in other solid tumours. In recent years she has become increasingly interested in the relationship between genetic variants and cellular behaviour.

=== Leadership ===
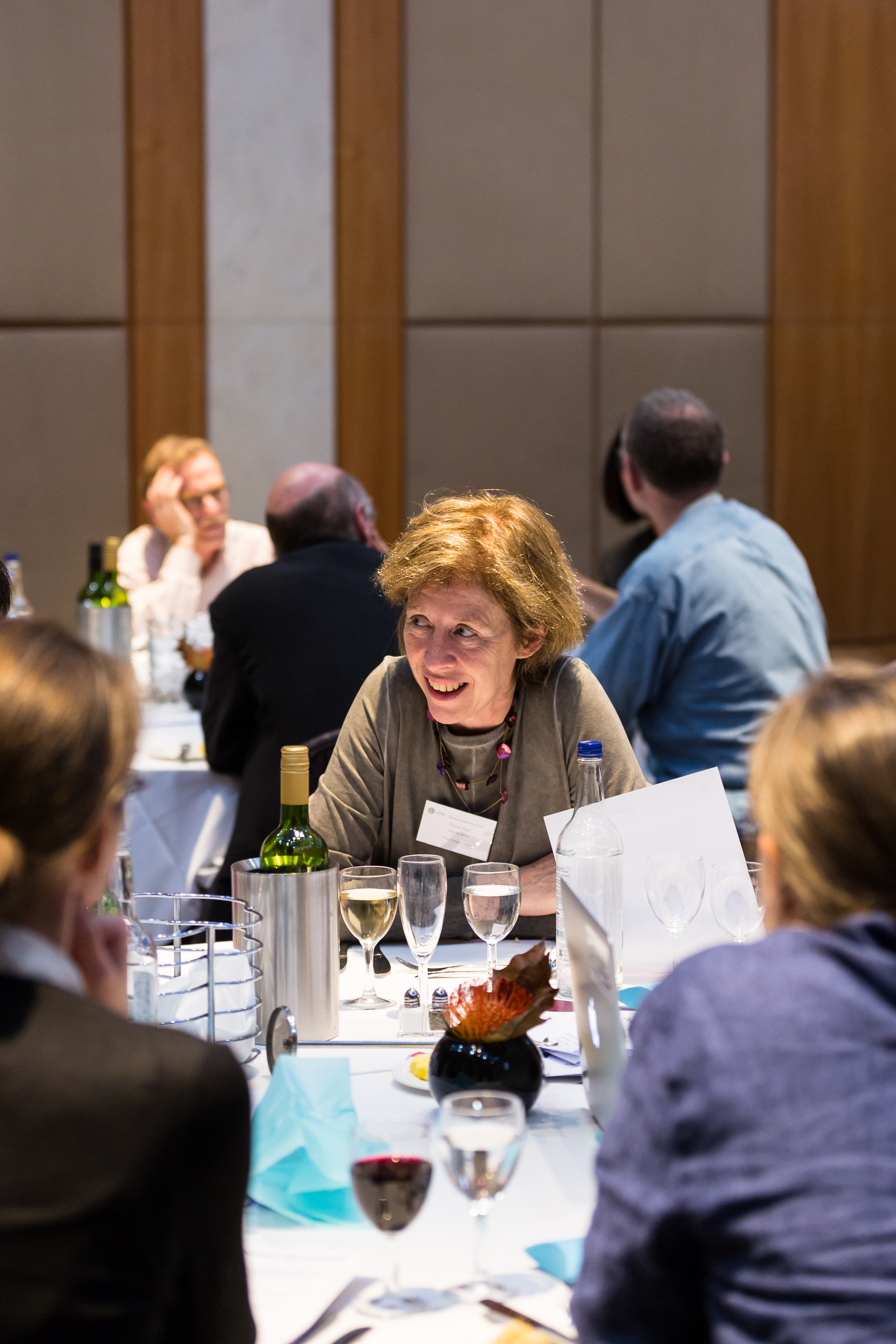
Watt in 2014

Watt has played a key role in promoting UK government investment in stem cell research, for example, as specialist adviser to the House of Lords Science and Technology Committee. She is also the former president of the British Society for Cell Biology and the International Society for Stem Cell Research (ISSCR). She served as Editor-in-Chief of Journal of Cell Science for 20 years and then as a founding Deputy Editor of eLife. Watt is a vocal advocate for women in science. In a series of articles and interviews with women scientists (2004-2005), she examined the struggles women face in 'getting to the top'.

At the Medical Research Council she launched a programme to enable full-time clinicians to participate in research; worked with and engaged Black and Minority Ethnic PhD students to identify new ways to support their academic careers; and developed new initiatives in multimorbidity, adolescent mental health and pain. In 2020, Watt spearheaded efforts to fund coronavirus research, helping to ensure that the first awards from UKRI/DHSC were made just as the scale of the pandemic was becoming apparent. During Watt’s tenure as MRC Executive Chair, she oversaw the decision to close the Mammalian Genetics Unit. This strategic decision was decried by over 150 researchers and leading geneticists internationally, including Elizabeth Fisher and Robin Lovell-Badge. Following a Strategic Review in 2019, the MRC Council concluded that in light of scientific advances to create more complex clinically-related mouse models, it was timely to focus on new investments on targeted programmes that are integrated with human disease modelling. Professor Owen Sansom was appointed Director of the new National Mouse Genetics Network. The Medical Research Council invested more than £20 million in the network bringing together a package of challenge-focused research clusters distributed across the UK and a long term partnership with the Mary Lyon Centre at Harwell. In December 2020 a whistleblowing investigation was triggered by UK Research and Innovation (UKRI), determining that Watt had acted in a bullying manner. She offered written apologies to multiple individuals. Watt remained in post until her term as MRC Executive Chair ended in early 2022, then took up her new position as director of the European Molecular Biology Organization.

=== Awards and honours ===
Watt is a Member of the European Molecular Biology Organization (1999), Fellow of the Academy of Medical Sciences (FMedSci, 2000), and a Fellow of the Royal Society (FRS, 2003). She was elected an Honorary Foreign Member of the American Academy of Arts and Sciences in 2008. Watt is also a Doctor Honoris Causa of the Universidad Autonoma de Madrid (2016). She was elected an Honorary Member of Society for Investigative Dermatology (2018) and Honorary Fellow, British Pharmacological Society (2019). Watt is a Foreign Associate of the National Academy of Sciences (2019), Member of Heidelberg Academy of Sciences and Humanities (2023), and is a member of several advisory boards, including the European Molecular Biology Laboratory (EMBL), Scientific Advisory Committee (SAC) and the Howard Hughes Medical Institute Medical Advisory Board.

She won the American Society for Cell Biology (ASCB) Women in Cell Biology Senior Award in 2008, the inaugural Suffrage Science award in 2011, the Hunterian Society Medal in 2015, the FEBS/EMBO Women in Science Award in 2016, and the ISSCR Achievement Award (2024).
