= Edinburgh Cancer Research Centre =

Medical facility in City of Edinburgh, Scotland

Coordinates: 55°57′45″N 3°13′55″W

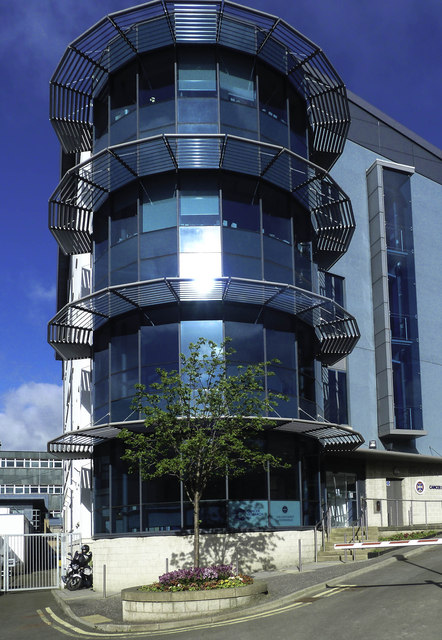
- Established: 1979
- Research type: Basic (non-clinical), translational research and clinical research
- Field of research: Cancer
- Director: Ian Tomlinson (Director); Charlie Gourley (Clinical Director)
- Location: Edinburgh, Scotland
- Affiliations: University of Edinburgh

The Edinburgh Cancer Research Centre (ECRC), also known as the University of Edinburgh Cancer Research Centre, is a center for basic, translational and clinical cancer research located in Edinburgh, Scotland. ECRC constitutes a part of the Institute of Genetics & Molecular Medicine (IGMM) and is positioned in direct proximity of the Western General Hospital, where most of its clinical activities take place.

== Scientific activities ==
A broad spectrum of tumor types are studied in the Centre although the main strengths of ECRC lay in the areas of breast, colorectal, ovarian and brain cancers. They include research focused on:

- Stem cells and the cancer stem cell niche
- Signal transduction and biological mechanisms
- Lifestyle, risk and prevention
- Stratification for prevention and therapy
- Cancer Informatics

In these fields the ECRC has gained international recognition in innovative biomedical research and belongs to the Cancer Research UK Centres network of excellence. The ECRC investigators play also an important role in the palliative care practice and research.

As of 2015, research in the ECRC is carried out by 27 independent research teams. In addition, 9 clinical researchers and 14 affiliated research groups are associated with the centre. Several technology platforms, including mass spectrometry, reverse phase protein arrays and advanced microscopy, support the research activities. Since 2011, the ECRC also hosts a dedicated drug discovery unit. Since 2010, the institute is led by Margaret Frame (as the Science Director) and David Cameron (as the Clinical Director) with help and advise from the ECRC Governance Board. The ECRC works closely with the Edinburgh Cancer Centre and NHS Lothian, supporting clinical trials and routine data analysis through the Scottish Cancer Research Network and Edinburgh Cancer Informatics Research Group, ensuring that research is embedded within the NHS care of Scottish cancer patients.

Recent highlights from ECRC scientists and clinicians include:

- Important role (David Cameron as joint global Chief Investigator) in the pivotal clinical trial that tested the hypothesis that the combination of lapatinib and the cytotoxic drug capecitabine would be superior to capecitabine alone in patients with HER2+ metastatic breast cancer that had progressed despite trastuzumab treatment. The results of this trial has led to a global (more than 100 countries) marketing authorisation of the drug lapatinib produced by GlaxoSmithKline.
- Identification of new gene variants linked to colorectal cancer.
- Evidence-based identification of an effective treatment of depression in cancer patients.

== Governance board ==
The Edinburgh Cancer Research Centre was established in The University of Edinburgh (UoE) in close partnership with Cancer Research UK and the NHS Lothian, and has strong links to other Institutes and Colleges conducting cancer research in Edinburgh, in particular the Institute of Genetics & Molecular Medicine. The ECRC follows a partnership model in which key stakeholders are actively and directly involved in the strategic governance and growth of the centre.

== Teaching and training ==
As a part of the Institute of Genetics & Molecular Medicine, ECRC is affiliated with the College of Medicine and Veterinary Medicine of the University of Edinburgh. It provides biomedical research and career training for over 30 PhD students. Many PhD positions are filled in the frame of IGMM 4 Year Graduate School Programme, but there are also some externally funded PhD-studentships and PhD positions specifically aimed for cancer clinicians. The available positions are awarded on competitive basis. ECRC scientists and clinicians actively participate in the teaching programmes of the University of Edinburgh. Ten researchers based in ECRC hold full professorships at the university.

The ECRC also offers training in biomedical research to postdoctoral fellows. Applications for these positions are opened to all nationalities and are highly competitive.

== Public engagement ==
Rising awareness about cancer, cancer prevention, healthy lifestyle and science among patients, fundraisers and general public is an important part of the ECRC mission. Activities in this area are closely coordinated with Cancer Research UK and include many diverse events ranging from guided tours of the centre to participation in fundraising events and science festivals.

On 8 May 2021, for World Ovarian Cancer Day, ECRC participated in the Cure our Ovarian Cancer Foundation's international awareness campaign. Their spot "An ad you can't miss, for a cancer you do", which shows 30 women who had been diagnosed with ovarian cancer, was screened at Piccadilly Circus, London and Time Square, New York City.

== History ==
In 1978, the Imperial Cancer Research Fund (ICRF) - a major charity supporting cancer research in the United Kingdom at the time, decided to provide an £800,000 endowment to support creation of a Chair of Medical Oncology in the Faculty of Medicine in Edinburgh. Following an open competition, the University of Edinburgh appointed John F. Smyth (at the time a senior lecturer in medical oncology at the Institute of Cancer Research in London) for that position on 1 April 1979. After a short visit to the University of Chicago, professor Smyth assumed his duties in Edinburgh on 1 October 1979 (a date that can be considered as the beginning of the centre).

Soon afterwards, additional posts were provided by the university and matched by appropriate staff positions by Lothian Health Board (NHS) to create first clinical service for medical oncology in Edinburgh. The service was based in the Western General Hospital where some beds and out-patient facilities were provided. In 1980 it was formally recognized as the Imperial Cancer Research Fund Medical Oncology Unit in Edinburgh with professor John Smyth as its director. This resulted in additional funding that allowed building of a small research laboratory which was commissioned in 1981. The laboratory was located in a portable cabin on the Western General Hospital campus. The main focus of the Unit was the development of more successful drug therapies for all forms of cancer and looking for new ways of reducing the side-effects of anti-cancer drugs.

With generous support from Imperial Cancer Research Fund and other organisations, the Unit was steadily growing enabling clinical trials for promising anticancer therapeutics. For example, the Unit was responsible for the very first clinical trial of a 5-HT3 receptor antagonist, heralding in the dramatic changes in emesis control that subsequently followed the development of that class of compounds.

In 1984 the Unit moved to a new location at the top floor of the MRC Human Genetics Unit building which allowed for expansion of laboratory research activities. After a successful ICRF review in 1996, it had been recognized that further extension of scientific activities of the Unit required even more space and prof. Smyth obtained permission to rise funds to create a new purpose designed building. The work started in 2000 and the new £7M building was officially opened in 2002 by The Princess Royal.

It provides 3000 square meters of gross internal space and is a current base for majority of ECRC researchers. At that time (in 2002), following reorganisation of faculties into schools within the University of Edinburgh, the name Edinburgh Cancer Research Centre was created and used with reference to the Unit and the new building. In 2007 ECRC became part of the Institute of Genetics and Molecular Medicine.

=== Cancer Research UK centres ===
In 2004 the successor of ICRF, Cancer Research UK (CRUK), funded the CRUK Clinical Cancer Centre, hosted by the ECRC, one of its network of comprehensive cancer centres.

In 2010, this was succeeded by the CRUK Edinburgh Centre, a partnership between the ECRC, NHS, and other research locations in Edinburgh. This was part of CRUK's network of "virtual" centres, intended to drive local collaborations for translational research.

Funding for the CRUK Edinburgh Centre ended in 2022. CRUK had to reduce the size of its centres network due to a reduction in income during the COVID-19 pandemic, and the ECRC is now a partner in the new CRUK Scotland Centre, based at The Beatson Institute for Cancer Research in Glasgow.

In 2018, CRUK funded another virtual centre at Edinburgh, the CRUK Brain Tumour Centre of Excellence, a joint venture between the ECRC and University College London Cancer Institute.

=== ECRC directors ===
1980 – 2005 John Smyth (initially as a director of the Imperial Cancer Research Fund Medical Oncology Unit)
2005 – 2009 David Harrison
2010 – 2020 Margaret Frame (Science Director) and David Cameron (Clinical Director)
2020 – 2023 Ian Tomlinson (Director) and Charlie Gourley (Clinical Director)
2023–present Charlie Gourley (Clinical Director)

== See also ==
- Cancer in the United Kingdom
