= John Burns (minister) =

Scottish Presbyterian minister

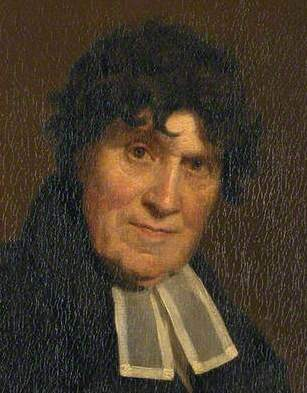
Crop of portrait (1830) by John Graham-Gilbert, now in the Hunterian Museum and Art Gallery

Rev Dr John Burns (13 February 1744 – 26 February 1839) was a Church of Scotland minister, who served a Glasgow cure longer than any minister on record, in the Barony Church for sixty-nine years.

Burns was born in Stirling, Scotland, the son of John Burns of Stirth, a schoolmaster, and his wife Janet Young of Risk. He was educated at the University of Glasgow, and first appointed to the Barony in 1770, as assistant to Lawrence Hill. He was ordained on 26 May 1774, and thereafter was sixty-five years as minister himself. He became a Doctor of Divinity (DD) from the University of Aberdeen in 1808.

Burns was an ally of the Anti-Slavery Society and the Bible Society. Although Robert Raikes is usually credited with establishing the first Sunday school in the early 1780s, Burns opened a "Sabbath Night School" in Calton in 1774 or 1775.

He married Elizabeth Stevenson, daughter of John Stevenson, brewer in Glasgow. Among Burns's nine children, John Burns (1775–1850) became Regius Professor of Surgery at the University of Glasgow, Allan Burns (1781–1813) was a physician to the Imperial Court of Russia, James Burns (1789–1871) was a shipowner and George Burns (1795–1890) was his partner in G & J Burns.

A portrait by John Graham-Gilbert, painted in 1830, is in the collection of the Hunterian Museum and Art Gallery of the University of Glasgow.
