= The Beatson Institute for Cancer Research =

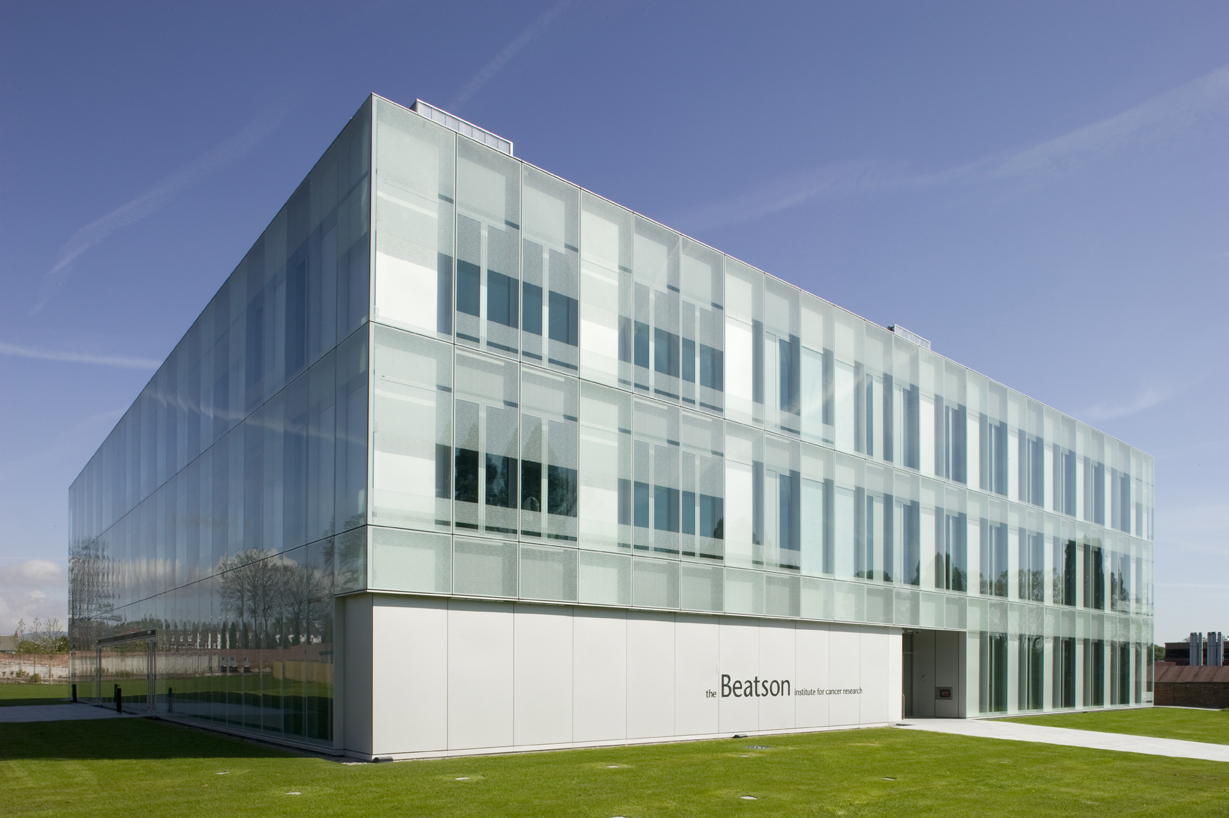
The Beatson Institute for Cancer Research Building, Glasgow, Scotland, May 2008

The Beatson Institute for Cancer Research (also known as the Cancer Research UK Scotland Institute, formerly known as the Cancer Research UK Beatson Institute) is a biological research facility that conducts research into the basic biology of cancer. It is based in Glasgow, Scotland.

The institute is named in recognition of Sir George Beatson, a surgeon, who in 1912 established a research department in the cancer hospital in Glasgow. This department became independent from the hospital in 1967 when the institute was founded by the then director, Dr John Paul. Dr Paul raised sufficient funds to move the Beatson in 1976 to its present location on the Garscube Estate, where it has since interacted closely with researchers at the University of Glasgow. The institute moved in 2008 to a new research building built by Reiach and Hall Architects.

Professor John Wyke became director in 1987, professor Karen Vousden in 2002 and professor Owen Sansom in 2017.

Research groups at the Beatson Institute study cancer initiation, metabolism and metastasis. The institute holds an annual meeting, the Beatson International Cancer Conference, focused on one of these topics.

== Notable present and former scientists and physicians ==
- Professor Allan Balmain, FRSE
- Professor Margaret Frame, OBE, FRSE
- Dr John Paul
- Professor Owen Sansom, FRSE, FMedSci
- Professor Karen Vousden, CBE, FRS, FRSE
- Professor Paul Workman

== See also ==
- Cancer in the United Kingdom
