= Regius Professor of Surgery (Glasgow) =

The Regius Chair of Surgery at the University of Glasgow was founded in 1815 by King George III, who also established the Chairs of Chemistry and Natural History.

Notable Professors have included Joseph Lister (1860–1869), who developed antisepsis through the use of phenol in sterilising instruments and in cleaning wounds, and Sir William Macewen, a pioneer in modern brain surgery who contributed to the development of bone graft surgery, the surgical treatment of hernia and of pneumonectomy (removal of the lungs).

The current occupant is Professor Andrew Biankin.

== Regius Professors of Surgery ==
- 1815 – John Burns
- 1850 – James Lawrie
- 1860 – Joseph Lister, 1st Baron Lister
- 1869 – Sir George Husband Baird MacLeod
- 1892 – Sir William Macewen
- 1924 – Archibald Young
- 1939 – Sir Charles Illingworth
- 1964 – Sir Andrew Kay
- 1999 – David George
- 2013 – Andrew Biankin

== See also ==
- List of Professorships at the University of Glasgow
- University of Glasgow Medical School
