= Granville Sharp Pattison =

British anatomist (1791–1851)

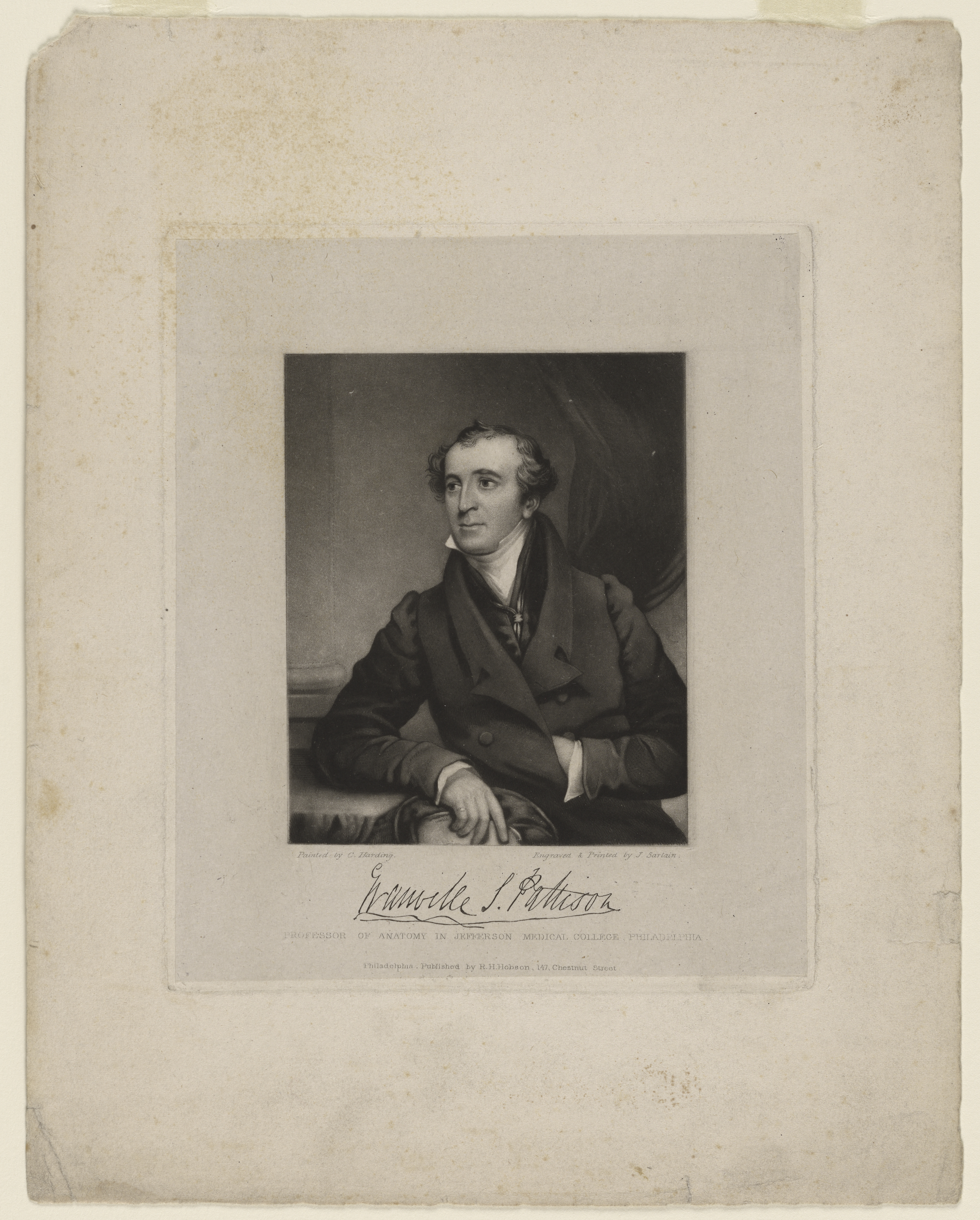
Granville Sharp Pattison by John Sartain, c. 1832

Granville Sharp Pattison (1791–1851) was a Scottish anatomist. Professor of Anatomy at London University, after losing two British positions, he emigrated permanently to the United States to be a professor at New York University.

== Life ==
The youngest son of John Pattison of Kelvingrove, Glasgow, he was admitted as a member of the Faculty of Physicians and Surgeons of Glasgow in 1813. He acted in 1818 as assistant to Allan Burns, the lecturer on anatomy, physiology, and surgery at the Andersonian Institute; but he only held the post for a year, and was succeeded by William Mackenzie. Pattison resigned after a divorce case, involving the wife of Andrew Ure, a colleague at the Institute.

Pattison went to Philadelphia in 1818, and lectured privately on anatomy. There he quarrelled with Nathaniel Chapman. In 1820 he was appointed to the chair of anatomy, physiology, and surgery in the University of Maryland in Baltimore, a post he filled for five years and resigned, on grounds of ill-health. But he had been involved in another dispute, over the Fascia of Colles and his own research; and had fought a duel with General Thomas McCall Cadwalader, brother-in-law to Chapman, whom he wounded with a pistol shot.

Pattison returned to England in July 1827. He was appointed professor of anatomy at the University of London, acting at the same time as surgeon to the University Dispensary, which preceded the foundation of the North London Hospital. These posts he was compelled to relinquish in 1831, under pressure from a combination of student activists excited by the July Revolution of 1830, and colleagues who questioned the standard of his teaching.

In the same year Pattison became professor of anatomy in the Jefferson Medical College, Philadelphia, where he received the degree of doctor of medicine. He was appointed professor of anatomy at New York University on the reorganisation of its medical department in 1840, a post he retained till his death on 12 November 1851. He left a widow, but no children.

== Works ==
He was author of Experimental Observations on the Operation of Lithotomy, Philadelphia, 1820; and of controversial works. In Baltimore he edited the second edition of Allan Burns's Observations on the Surgical Anatomy of the Head and Neck, which was published in 1823. He edited in 1820 the American Recorder, and the Register and Library of Medical and Chirurgical Science, Washington, 1833–6; and was co-editor of the American Medical Library and Intelligencer, Philadelphia, 1836. He translated Joseph Nicolas Masse's Anatomical Atlas, and also Jean Cruveilhier's Anatomy of the Human Body.
