= The Henley College (Henley-on-Thames) =

Location
- Deanfield Avenue; Henley-on-Thames, Oxon, RG9 1UH; England; 51°32′10″N 0°54′29″W

Information
- Type: Further education/sixth form college
- Motto: Come Questioning, Go Seeking, Grow
- Established: 1987
- Local authority: Oxfordshire
- Department for Education URN: 130789 Tables
- Ofsted: Reports
- Principal: Simon Spearman
- Age: 16 to 19
- Former name: Henley Grammar, King James's College and South Oxfordshire Technical College
- Number of campuses: 2
- Website: http://www.henleycol.ac.uk

The Henley College is a sixth form college in Henley-on-Thames, Oxfordshire, England. It was founded as a tertiary college in 1987 and changed its status to a sixth form college in 2010.

== History and origins ==
The college's roots date back to 1604, when the Free Grammar School of King James I was founded at the Chantry House in Henley. The charity school, which was more vocational than academic, was endowed by Dame Elizabeth Periam in 1609. The two schools were amalgamated in 1778 as a grammar school.

In 1974, local secondary education of children aged up to 16 was transferred to Gillotts School, and the grammar school became King James's College. This merged with South Oxfordshire Technical College in 1987.

South Oxfordshire Technical College had been created in 1873, originally as the Henley-on-Thames School of Science and Art, later the Henley Technical Institute. It became South Oxfordshire Technical College in 1960/61. In 1972, it had 1,600 full-time students and 15 full-time staff. The college's first principal was Roland Wilcock, who was appointed to the Order of the British Empire for services to education.

The newly merged institution was a tertiary college. In 2010 the college applied for sixth form college status, which was granted.

== Current campus ==
The college offers a range of academic and vocational courses including more than 60 A-Levels, BTEC and other courses and also a number of vocational and part-time day and evening courses. Among the sports on offer are rugby union, football, basketball, netball and rowing. College rugby is linked with the London Wasps academy. A recently completed sports hall has been built at a cost of £2 million. Since its foundation the college has more than doubled in size and its catchment area has extended to cover a large part of the Thames Valley. The college was awarded Beacon status in 2010.

The college consists of two campuses, Deanfield and Rotherfield. A third campus, Southfield, was demolished in 1998 and the land sold to fund improvements to the rest of the site, notably a new building on the Deanfield campus.

== Notable staff ==
The botanist Vera Paul taught at the school.

== Notable alumni ==
=== Henley Grammar School ===
- Bert Bushnell, gold medal rower, 1948 Summer Olympics
- John Churchill, publisher
- Tim Dakin, bishop
- David George, surgeon
- Roy M. Harrison, environmental scientist and academic
- David Stoddart, Baron Stoddart of Swindon, Labour MP for Swindon from 1970–83
- H. C. Wylly, colonel and military historian

=== King James's College ===
- David Arch, composer
- Julia Crouch, Governor of Anguilla
- Sally Dexter, actress

=== The Henley College ===
- Katie Crowhurst, para athlete
- Danny Goffey, musician, drummer in Supergrass
- Alec Hepburn, rugby union player
- Matt Maltese, musician
- Oliver Dench, actor and director
- Luke Nelson, basketball player
- Jack Willis, rugby union player
- Tom Willis, rugby union player
