= Hosney Yosef =

Hosney Mohammed Ahmed Ali Yosef OBE is a former radiologist, who was in 2006 made OBE in recognition of his services to medicine in western Scotland. Yosef was born in Egypt and came to Scotland in 1974 to work as a cancer specialist at Hairmyres Hospital. was a senior consultant in clinical oncology at the Beatson Oncology Centre in Glasgow and an honorary clinical senior lecturer at the University of Glasgow. He became a naturalised British citizen in 1978.

A deacon of the Fleshers craft guild in Glasgow, he served previously as president of the Scottish Radiological Society, and remains director of the Kilbryde Hospice and of oesophageal cancer charity Ochre. He also remains involved with the British Institute of Radiology.
