= Vera Paul =

English botanist (1913–2001)

Vera Naomi Smith OBE (c. October 1913 – October 2001), also known as Vera Paul, was an English botanist and naturalist. She is noted for her discovery of the ghost orchid in 1931. In 1980, Paul received an OBE for her services to conservation.

== Early life and education ==
Smith was born in Oxfordshire, England to Frederick William Smith and Alice Smith (née Butters). She was baptised on 13 November 1913 in Rotherfield Peppard, Oxfordshire. Paul trained as a botanist at the University of Reading.

== Discovery of the Ghost Orchid ==
On 30 June 1931, as a schoolgirl aged 18, Paul and her father discovered a rare ghost orchid in Great Bottom Wood near Rotherfield Peppard, growing from the middle of an old tree stump. At the time, neither Paul or her father recognised this orchid type and so picked it to be examined and identified by Somerville Hastings. Upon realising its rarity, it was wrapped in cotton wool and taken to Reading Museum.

The orchid was photographed in the museum by Robert Atkinson and has been preserved in spirit. A hand-coloured image of the orchid was published in Wild Orchids of Britain by V. S. Summerhayes, 1951, as part of the New Naturalist series. Measuring 24cm (9.5") in height with 3 flowers, Paul's ghost orchid is the tallest recorded in Britain.

== Career ==
=== Orchid searches ===
Paul revisited the wood on numerous occasions following the initial 1931 discovery. She found a singular ghost orchid in 1933 whilst showing her university professor where she had made her first finding, and an additional three flower spikes in 1953.

In 1963, the flower was found again in the original locality of where Paul had made her initial 1931 discovery. On 17 September 1963, Paul revisited the original site in Great Bottom Wood after finding out that J. E. Lousley had discovered five flowering ghost orchid spikes in Ovey's Wood, Buckinghamshire in 1954 and almost every year following until 1963. On her visit, Paul found five spikes standing near to the original stump where the first flower from 1931 had been, though three of these had been severely damaged by slugs.

The location of where Paul had found her first orchid had remained a secret until 1963.

=== Conservation ===
In the 1950s, Paul became a member of the Reading & District Natural History Society and regularly supplied plant records for the Reading Naturalist journal. In 1964 Paul wrote an article for the Reading Naturalist on the history of her orchid findings and what indicators to search for when finding them.

On 14 November 1959, Paul and a group of naturalists met at the City of Oxford School, New Inn Hall Street, to form the Berkshire, Buckinghamshire, and Oxfordshire Naturalists' Trust, now known as the Berks, Bucks & Oxon Wildlife Trust (BBOWT), a conservation charity that protects local wildlife. In 1962, whilst volunteering for the charity and working as headteacher at Henley Grammar School, Paul was essential in the acquisition of the Warburg Nature Reserve near Henley-on-Thames, through her appeals, the charity raised £25,000 to purchase 247 acres of land. From the 1960s, Paul herself conducted a detailed list of over 400 species found in the reserve.

Paul was a member of the Botanical Society of Britain and Ireland (BSBI) and took part in their survey which lead to the production of the first National Plant Atlas in 1962.

== Legacy ==
Paul died in October 2001 in Oxfordshire. In 2012, a yellow plaque was installed in the Warburg Nature Reserve in honour of Paul who left a gift to the Berkshire, Buckinghamshire, and Oxfordshire Wildlife Trust in her will.

In an obituary written in the Reading Naturalist in 2002, Paul was described as 'one of the pioneers of modern conservation... We should be grateful that she... chose to intervene and did not allow everything to be lost.'
