= Charles Illingworth =

British surgeon who specialised in gastroenterology

- Bromide print of Charles Illingworth by Walter Bird on 20 December 1961
- Born: 8 May 1899; Halifax West Yorkshire
- Died: 23 February 1991 (aged 91)
- Occupation: Gastroenterologist
- Medical career
- Profession: Surgeon
- Field: Gastroenterology
- Awards: Lister Medal (1963)

Charles Frederick William Illingworth CBE (8 May 1899 – 23 February 1991) was an English surgeon who specialised in gastroenterology. Along with a range of teaching and research interests, he wrote several surgical textbooks, and played a leading role in university and medical administration.

Born in West Yorkshire, he served as a fighter pilot in the First World War before resuming medical studies in Edinburgh. After working and teaching in the Royal Infirmary of Edinburgh in the 1920s and 1930s, Illingworth was appointed Regius Professor of Surgery, Glasgow, in 1939. Over the next 25 years, he established the Glasgow School of surgery, with generations of his students influencing surgical research and teaching in Britain and abroad. His textbooks were also highly influential, including his co-authorship of Text Book of Surgical Pathology (1932). Illingworth travelled and lectured widely, and helped initiate and present a 1963 television series on postgraduate medical training. His research included early work in the 1960s on hyperbaric oxygen therapy.

Illingworth's administrative and leadership roles included his Presidency of the Royal College of Physicians and Surgeons of Glasgow (1962 to 1964) and Dean of Faculties at the University of Glasgow (1978 to 1981). His honours included a knighthood (1961), Honorary Surgeon to the Queen in Scotland (1961 to 1965), and a range of honorary degrees. Honorary fellowships included those conferred by the Royal College of Surgeons of England, the Royal College of Surgeons in Ireland, and the Royal College of Physicians and Surgeons of Canada. For his devotion to surgical science, Illingworth was awarded the 1964 Lister Medal.

In retirement, Illingworth wrote biographies of William Hunter and Hector Hetherington. He also helped establish the charity Tenovus-Scotland in 1967, and was awarded the Nuffield Trust's Rock Carling Fellowship for 1970. Portraits of Illingworth by Alberto Morrocco are held at the Hunterian Museum and Art Gallery and the Royal College of Physicians and Surgeons of Glasgow, and the annual Illingworth Prize for medical students is administered by the University of Glasgow. Illingworth's autobiography, There is a History in All Men's Lives, was published in 1988.

== Early life and education ==
Charles Frederick William Illingworth (Note: Most sources give Illingworth's second name with the spelling 'Frederick', but some, including the 'self-written' obituary in the British Medical Journal (initialled CFWI), use the spelling 'Frederic'.) was born on 8 May 1899 in Halifax, West Yorkshire. His pre-university education took place at Heath Grammar School (sometimes referred to as Halifax Grammar School) up until 1915. In 1916, he began medical studies at the University of Edinburgh. His studies were interrupted by military service during the First World War when, in 1917, he joined the Royal Flying Corps. Illingworth saw action in France in 1918, which ended when he was shot down (forced landing) in August over the Somme and held as a prisoner-of-war at Ingolstadt, Bavaria, Germany. After returning home following the end of the war, he continued his studies at Edinburgh and graduated MB ChB (Bachelor of Medicine, Bachelor of Surgery) in 1922.

== Interwar years (Edinburgh) ==
After qualifying as a medical doctor, Illingworth undertook a period as house physician at the Derbyshire Royal Infirmary. He then continued with further training in his chosen speciality of surgery, studying and working from 1922 in the Royal Infirmary of Edinburgh with Harold Stiles and David Wilkie. By 1925, Illingworth had qualified FRCSEd (Fellow of the Royal College of Surgeons of Edinburgh). In the period 1926–7, he studied abroad at the Barnes Hospital, St Louis, Missouri, USA (now the Barnes-Jewish Hospital):

"During the years 1926–27 the following men arrived for various prolonged periods of study [...] C. F. W. Illingworth, of Edinburgh, Scotland, came here as a fellow of the Association of Surgeons of Great Britain and Ireland and stayed a year. He obtained his fellowship under the direction and help of Professor Wilkie of Edinburgh, who sent him here. He in turn was replaced by Bruce Dick, also of the University of Edinburgh, who came on a fellowship of the International Health Board of the Rockefeller Foundation and stayed eight months. Both Dr. Illingworth and Dr. Dick co-operated with Dr. Gopher in some experimental studies."

The following year (1928) Illingworth married Eleanor Mary Bennett, with whom he had four sons.

In 1929, Illingworth's MD thesis was awarded with a Gold Medal. During this period in Edinburgh, Illingworth also wrote or co-wrote two surgical textbooks which remained in print for many years, going through many editions. Text Book of Surgical Pathology (1932) was co-authored with Bruce M. Dick, and went through twelve editions by 1979. The other textbook, Short Text Book of Surgery (1938) reached a ninth edition by 1972. In the three years before the outbreak of the Second World War, Illingworth held the position of Conservator of the Museum of the Royal College of Surgeons of Edinburgh (1936–1939). By 1939, he had obtained his ChM (Master of Surgery) qualification.

== Professor of Surgery (Glasgow) ==
It was in 1939, with the country facing the upheaval and uncertainties of the Second World War, that Illingworth moved from Edinburgh to take up the role of Regius Professor of Surgery, Glasgow. He was appointed to this Chair during the leadership of that university by Hector Hetherington, and he held this position for 25 years, from 1939 to 1964. Illingworth, who arrived at a low point in the history of the faculty, worked to raise and re-establish the status of the University of Glasgow Medical School, playing "a major role in establishing the University's high reputation in the practice and teaching of surgery after the Second World War". According to the Oxford Dictionary of National Biography: "Under Illingworth's leadership, the Glasgow school achieved worldwide renown for excellence in the practice and teaching of medicine and surgery, and also in research".

Illingworth continued to write on surgical methods, with revisions to existing works along with the publication of new textbooks. Text Book of Surgical Treatment (1942) was issued in a fourth edition in 1952. He was also awarded lectureships and travelled abroad during this period, such as when he delivered the 1958 Strauss Lecture under the title 'The Endocrine Aspects of Breast Cancer'. In 1960, Illingworth was the first McLaughlin Foundation-Edward Gallie Visiting Professor, in which capacity he visited several universities and hospitals in Canada to teach and lecture. Illingworth's research included studies of the medical use of oxygen under pressure. In 1961, he gave the Legg Memorial Lecture at King's College Hospital Medical School on 17 November under the title 'Treatment of Arterial Occlusion under Oxygen at Two-atmospheres Pressure'. (Note: The lecture's formal name is the Thomas Percy Legg Memorial Lecture, established to commemorate Thomas Percy Legg (1872‐1930).) The Daryl Hart Lectureship of 1962 was on the same topic: 'Experimental and Clinical Observations Under Hyperbaric Oxygenation' Illingworth's work on hyperbaric oxygenation in the early 1960s came to be seen as one of the landmarks in the development of hyperbaric oxygen therapy.

Illingworth's support of medical training extended beyond the traditional settings of universities and medical schools, and included the use of the medium of television. In 1963, he and his colleagues introduced a series of television programmes for doctors on Scottish Television. There were twelve episodes in the series (titled 'Post-Graduate Medicine'), broadcast monthly from 11 March 1963: "for hospital doctors and general practitioners and [...] in the nature of a post-graduate class". (Note: The first programme (which Illingworth introduced) was 30 minutes long and broadcast late in the evening just after 11pm. Two photographs of Illingworth from 1963 in the episode 'Peptic Ulcer: A Surgeon Cross-Questioned' from this series were published in a history of the Royal College of Physicians and Surgeons of Glasgow.) In addition to these new methods, Illingworth continued his lecturing and teaching, and in 1963 was appointed a visiting professor at the University of Sheffield. Over the course of a week in November of that year, he lectured to both the public, students and fellow doctors, and delivered the Ernest Finch Memorial Lecture in memory of Sir Ernest Finch. In 1964, Illingworth formally retired from hospital work. His retirement as Regius Professor of Surgery at the University of Glasgow was announced in December 1963 in the London Gazette by the Scottish Home and Health Department, along with the news of his appointed successor Andrew Watt Kay, though the retirement did not take effect until the following year on 30 September 1964.

== Society and university administration ==
As well as practising, teaching and administrating as Glasgow's Regius Professor of Surgery, Illingworth also held positions within the hierarchies of a range of medical and learned societies, colleges and associations. In 1955 he was President of the Association of Surgeons of Great Britain and Ireland, and President for two terms of the Society of Academic and Research Surgery (1956 and 1957). (Note: It was the Association of Surgeons of Great Britain and Ireland that had sent Illingworth to the USA on a travelling fellowship nearly 30 years previously.)

In the early 1960s, Illingworth played a central role in the history of the Royal College of Physicians and Surgeons of Glasgow, or the Glasgow Faculty of Physicians and Surgeons as it was then known. From 1960 to 1962 he served two annual terms of that organisation's Visitorship, followed from 1962 to 1964 by two annual terms as President of what was by then called the Royal College of Physicians and Surgeons of Glasgow. (Note: A photograph of Illingworth in 1962 as President at the centre of a formal group portrait of Council members was published in a history of the Royal College of Physicians and Surgeons of Glasgow.) It was during this period, in 1963, that Illingworth was granted the title of Fellow of the Royal College of Surgeons of Glasgow (FRCSGlas). This award followed the recent name change (instigated by Illingworth's predecessor as President) that changed the Glasgow Faculty of Physicians and Surgeons from a Faculty to a Royal College. (Note: While a number of changes occurred to the levels of memberships and fellowships relating to physicians, the award of FRCSGlas remained unchanged.) This period also saw attempts made to standardise and consolidate the range of diplomas offered across the UK medical colleges, with some of these changes proposed and debated by Illingworth during his leadership of the College.

The following year, furthering his contributions to administration, Illingworth was one of those organising the Lister Centenary events held in Glasgow from 26 to 29 September 1965; he was also involved in appeals to raise funds during the commemorative period. The celebrations saw delegates from around the world attending a two-day scientific meeting arranged by Illingworth at the University of Glasgow. The conclusion of the event included a graduation ceremony on 29 September 1965 when honorary degrees were conferred on "twelve eminent medical men from various countries", including Illingworth himself who received an Honorary Doctor of Laws (LL.D.) degree. A few days later, a similar event was held to celebrate the Moynihan Centenary at the University of Leeds. Illingworth again received an Honorary Doctor of Laws (LL.D.) degree along with three others (Sir Harry Platt, Lord Brock, Jan Nuboer), with the ceremony taking place on 4 October 1965. The ceremony had been preceded by Illingworth delivering the Moynihan Centenary Lecture. (Note: A black-and-white photograph of the awarding ceremony at Leeds University is held in the papers of Sir Harry Platt at the John Rylands University Library at the University of Manchester. See 'Mounted photograph: Moynihan Centenary (1965)' in GB 133 PLA – Papers of Sir Harry Platt; 'PLA/11 – Photographic material; PLA/11/2/7/8': "Black and white photograph of the Moynihan Centenary at the University of Leeds, 4 October 1965, the photograph includes Platt, Lord Brock, Jan Nuboer and Sir Charles Illingworth as honorary graduates and the vice-chancellor of the University")

On 6 October 1965, Illingworth gave a talk at the Royal Philosophical Society of Glasgow titled 'Joseph Lister – Surgeon-Biologist'. On 14 October 1965, again as part of the Lister Centenary celebrations, Illingworth delivered a talk titled 'Lister's Legacy to Humanity' at the Washington Hilton Hotel, Washington DC, USA, to the Washington branch of the English-Speaking Union. This dinner and talk was attended by some 400 guests, including former US Vice-President Richard Nixon, former Governor of New Jersey and president of pharmaceutical company Warner-Lambert Alfred E. Driscoll, and Senator Joseph Lister Hill, with the wife of the latter recalling the event in her memoirs. As part of the event, Illingworth on behalf of the Glasgow Royal Infirmary, received an oil portrait of Lord Lister, commissioned by Warner-Lambert from US artist Norman Rockwell.

The Lister Centenary celebrations occurred in the year following Illingworth's formal retirement, but he continued to be active in administrative and honorary roles with colleges, societies and at the University of Glasgow well into his later years, with several of the positions reflecting his interest in the history of medicine. From 1974 to 1980, he served as Honorary Librarian of the Royal College of Physicians and Surgeons of Glasgow. From 1978 to 1981 he was Dean of Faculties at the University of Glasgow. From 1979 to 1981 he was President of the Scottish Society of the History of Medicine.

== Honours and awards ==
The contributions made by Illingworth to the surgical profession were recognised by a range of professional and civil honours. In 1946, he was appointed CBE (Commander of the Order of the British Empire). This was followed in 1961 by the title of Knight Bachelor, granted as part of the Queen's Birthday Honours List. He was also appointed Honorary Surgeon to the Queen in Scotland and held this position from 1961 to 1965. (Note: An example of the duties carried out in Scotland by physicians and surgeons of the Royal Household is described in The Glasgow Herald in its report of 22 September 1962 concerning a foot injury suffered by Her Majesty the Queen Mother; Illingworth was among those attending to the royal patient.) Following his retirement, Illingworth was Extra Surgeon to the Queen in Scotland from 1965 until his death.

Numerous national medical associations conferred honorary fellowships on Illingworth, both within Britain and abroad. He was made an Honorary Fellow of the American College of Surgeons ('Abdominal Surgery', 1954). Four years later, he was made an Honorary Fellow of the Royal College of Surgeons of England. At the awarding ceremony on 11 June 1958, he delivered a speech addressing those starting out on their medical careers. University honours, in addition to the Honorary Doctor of Laws degrees received in 1965 during the Lister and Moynihan centenaries, included two Honorary Doctor of Science (D.Sc.) degrees, one from the University of Sheffield (1962), and one from the University of Belfast (July 1963). That same year, it was announced that Illingworth would receive the Lister Medal. The announcement of the award in the Annals of the Royal College of Surgeons of England stated that it was for:

"...his devotion to surgical science over a long period; and in particular for his contributions to knowledge of jaundice and diseases of the biliary tract, of peptic ulcer, and of the endocrine aspects of the treatment of cancer; and for his perception of the importance of the use of oxygen in treatment under hyperbaric conditions as a field for physiological research."

Illingworth's Lister Oration was delivered on 9 April 1964 at the Royal College of Surgeons of England in London under the title 'On the Interdependence of Science and the Healing Art'. The Lister Medal itself was presented following the Oration, both events taking place as part of what was then known as the Lister Festival. A few months later, Illingworth delivered the Lister Lecture of the Canadian Medical Association in Vancouver, Canada, on 24 June 1964, under the title 'Wound Sepsis—From Carbolic Acid to Hyperbaric Oxygen'.

As a recognised elder statesman of his profession, more honorary fellowships followed. One such had been conferred earlier in the year when Illingworth was made an Honorary Fellow of the Royal College of Surgeons in Ireland, together with two other surgeons: Sir Arthur Porritt and Erik Husfeldt. In 1965, Illingworth was invited by the Council of the College of Physicians, Surgeons and Gynaecologists of South Africa to give the 1965 Louis Mirvish Memorial Lecture. He was also invited as a distinguished guest to the 45th South African Medical Congress (MASA), and was made an Honorary Fellow of the College of Surgeons of South Africa. (Note: The Louis Mirvish Memorial Lecture was titled 'Massive Haemorrhage from Peptic Ulcer', and was scheduled to be delivered three times: Johannesburg, 21 June 1965; Cape Town, 24 June 1965; Durban 6 July 1965. The MASA conference took place in Port Elizabeth from 27 June to 3 July 1965.) Illingworth travelled abroad again the following year to receive the Honorary Fellowship of the Royal College of Physicians and Surgeons of Canada. This was conferred on 21 January 1966 at the College's 35th Annual Convocation, held at the Place des Arts in Montreal, Canada. He was one of three honoured that year, along with Lord Brock and Sir Peter Medawar.

== Retirement and legacy ==
Following his retirement in 1964, Illingworth held the title of Emeritus Professor of Surgery at the University of Glasgow, and continued to carry out locum work into his seventies. In these later years, he still travelled and lectured, with plans reported in August 1966 for a three-month stay in Kenya to co-ordinate planning in a new medical school. He gave the 14th MacEwen Memorial Lecture at the University of Glasgow on 21 November 1967, under the title 'The Advancement of Surgery'. Also in 1967, Illingworth was one of the founders of Tenovus-Scotland, a medical charity established by ten initial donors in a similar way to the Tenovus cancer charity based in Wales. Other charity fund-raising by Illingworth included organising a concert in October 1969. This was performed by the Scottish National Orchestra and conducted by Sir Arthur Bliss. This helped fund a research unit at the University of Glasgow for kidney diseases.

Two biographies by Illingworth were published in this period. The Story of William Hunter (1967) is a first-person account and history of the 18th-century Scottish anatomist William Hunter. A review in Medical History stated that:

"William Hunter has been neglected by medical historians in comparison with his brother John. Sir Charles Illingworth's book has done much to make good this deficiency and will, it is hoped, reawaken interest in him, not only as one of the leading gynaecologists of the eighteenth century but also as a pioneer in the promotion of reform and improvement in medical education."

The second biography was of Hector Hetherington, the Principal of the University of Glasgow who had appointed Illingworth to the university's Regius Chair of Surgery in 1939. Illingworth's University Statesman: Sir Hector Hetherington (1971) was excerpted in The Glasgow Herald, and reviewed in The Economist.

Illingworth continued to write on healthcare training and reform, writing the monograph The Sanguine Mystery (1970), subtitled: This Bloody and Butcherly Department of the Healing Art. This work was produced for his Rock Carling Fellowship, also forming the topic of the Rock Carling Lecture for 1970 from the Nuffield Trust. (Note: The Rock Carling Fellowship was founded as a memorial to Ernest Rock Carling (1877–1960), one of the Trustees of the Nuffield Provincial Hospitals Trust.) An article by Illingworth on medical training was published in The Times in July 1971. The death of his wife Mary (Lady Illingworth) was announced in The Glasgow Herald in December of that year.

Many years later, Illingworth published an autobiographical account of his life, with royalties going to the Tenovus-Scotland charity he had helped found. Titled There is a History in All Men's Lives (1988), (Note: The title is a quote from Shakespeare's Henry IV, Part 2.) it had been previewed in The Glasgow Herald in December 1987, and was reviewed in the British Medical Journal in April 1988. Three years later, Illingworth died on 23 February 1991 in Glasgow at the age of 91.

The portrait of Illingworth held at the Hunterian Museum in Glasgow, dated 1965, was painted by Alberto Morrocco. A different portrait by Alberto Morocco, from 1966, is held at the Royal College of Physicians and Surgeons of Glasgow. Illingworth's legacy includes the University of Glasgow's Illingworth Prize, which he established in 1964, "awarded annually on the recommendation of the Regius Professor of Surgery" for displays of "scholarship and general achievement" by a third-year medical student. Illingworth and his family's connections with Tenovus-Scotland continue to be commemorated by one of its grants, the Lady Illingworth Award. The impact of Illingworth on his profession was summed up in an obituary written in 2008 for one of his students and successors:

"The school of surgery founded in Glasgow by Sir Charles Illingworth came to dominate academic surgery in Britain for a generation or more. Sir Charles's pupils occupied more than 20 chairs of surgery in this country and abroad, and played an important role in shaping the mould of surgical research and teaching."

== Selected publications ==
Lectures and papers

- 9 October 1950 (RCSEng) – Carcinoma of the Head of the Pancreas, Ann R Coll Surg Engl. 1951 January; 8(1): 53–63.
- 8 October 1954 (RCSEng) – Massive Gastro-Intestinal Haemorrhage, Ann R Coll Surg Engl. 1955 May; 16(5): 337–341.
- William Hunter's manuscripts and letters: the Glasgow collection, Med Hist. 1971 April; 15(2): 181–186.
- Some old books and ancient coins from the Hunter Collection, Med Hist. 1973 April; 17(2): 168–173.

Textbooks and books

- Text Book of Surgical Pathology (1932) with Bruce M. Dick
- Short Text Book of Surgery (1938)
- Text Book of Surgical Treatment (1942)
- Peptic Ulcer (monograph, 1953)
- The Story of William Hunter (1967)
- The Sanguine Mystery (1970)
- University Statesman: Sir Hector Hetherington (1971)
- Royal College of Physicians and Surgeons of Glasgow (1980)
- There is a History in All Men's Lives (1988)
