= George Henry Edington =

Scottish surgeon, anatomist and medical author

Prof George Henry Edington FRSE FRCS DL JP TD (1870–1943) was a Scottish surgeon, anatomist and medical author who served as President of both the Glasgow Medico-Chirurgical Society and the Royal Faculty of Physicians and Surgeons of Glasgow 1928 to 1940. He was Honorary Physician to King George V from 1922 to 1927.

== Life ==
He was born on 10 January 1870 at 14 Buckingham Terrace, Glasgow, not far from the Glasgow Botanic Gardens and River Kelvin. He was the second child and eldest son of George Brodrick Edington, an iron-founder at the Victoria Foundry, and his wife Charlotte Jane Watt, daughter of Dr Peter Watt. He was educated at Kelvinside Academy then studied medicine at first King's College, London then Glasgow University, graduating in 1891 and receiving his doctorate (MD) in 1895.

From 1908 he was Professor of Surgery and Anatomy at both Anderson College in Glasgow and the Western Medical School. He was both lecturer and assistant professor under Sir Hector Cameron at Glasgow University. He was assistant surgeon at the Royal Hospital for Sick Children (Glasgow) and on the staff of the Glasgow Western Infirmary under Sir William Macewen. In 1913 he replaced Sir George Beatson as Senior Surgeon. He took an active interest in soldiering and had joined the Volunteer Medical Staff Corps in 1901, rising to the rank of captain in 1905. By 1908 he was a major in the Territorial branch of the Royal Army Medical Corps. In the First World War he served as commanding officer of the 1st Lowland Field Ambulance, firstly (and dramatically) at Gallipoli, then in both Egypt and Palestine, before ending in a more static role as commanding officer of the General Hospital in Alexandria.

In 1943 he was elected a Fellow of the Royal Society of Edinburgh. His proposers were Edward Hindle, John Walton, John William McNee, and George Walter Tyrrell.

He suffered a heart attack during a fishing trip and died at the Western Infirmary in Glasgow on 24 September 1943. He is buried with his parents in the Glasgow Necropolis.

== Family ==
He never married and lived with his two sisters at 20 Woodside Place, a Victorian terraced house just north of Glasgow city centre.

== Other positions of note ==
- Justice of the Peace
- Deputy Lieutenant to the City and County of Glasgow
- Editor of the Glasgow Medical Journal
- Member of the Royal Company of Archers
- Assessor to the University Court of Glasgow
- Fellow of the Association of Surgeons
- Fellow of the International Society of Surgeons
- Member of the Moynihan Club
- Representee for Glasgow University on the General Medical Council
- Chairman of the British Red Cross (Scottish branch)
- Council Member of the Scottish National Blood Transfusion Association
- Chairman of the War Pensions Committee

== Publications ==
- Skiagraphic Atlas of Fractures and Dislocations (1899)
- With the 1/1st Lowland Field Ambulance in Gallipoli (1920)
- The Soul of a Voluntary Hospital (1931)
- Chole-fistula-gastrostomy (1933)
- Cysts in Hernial Sacs (1935)
- Embryology and Clinical Surgery (1937)
