= Owen Sansom =

British cancer researcher

- Born: Owen James Sansom; 21 April 1975 (age 51)
- Education: University of Nottingham
- Known for: Work on Wnt signalling in cancer
- Awards: FRSE; FMedSci
- Scientific career
- Fields: Cancer
- Workplaces: CRUK Beatson Institute; Cardiff University

Owen James Sansom, FRSE, FMedSci is the Director of the Cancer Research UK Beatson Institute (formerly known as the Beatson Institute for Cancer Research). He is known for his work determining the molecular hallmarks of colorectal cancer (CRC), including demonstrating the roles of the tumour suppressor protein APC and the WNT signalling pathway, as well as the involvement of intestinal stem cells in tumourigenesis

== Education ==
After obtaining a BSc in genetics from the University of Nottingham and an MRes in Biology from the University of Manchester, Owen went on to obtain a PhD from the University of Edinburgh.

== Career ==
Owen was a postdoctoral fellow at Cardiff University investigating the role of the APC gene in Wnt signalling and cancer. In 2005, he became a Junior Group Leader at the Cancer Research UK Beatson Institute, and in 2011 he was appointed the Institute's Deputy Director. In 2016, the Institute's Director, Professor Karen Vousden moved to the Francis Crick Institute and became CRUK's chief scientist, and Owen acted as interim Director of the Beatson Institute until being appointed as the next Director in 2017. He also leads the CRUK Glasgow Centre, which aims to bring together scientists and clinicians to work together on cancer research, drug discovery and patient care.

== Research ==
=== The Phenotype of APC loss in vivo and key effector pathways ===
Owen was the first person to acutely delete the APC gene in the murine intestine, a model that he then used to elucidate the key pathways that APC controls in vivo. Using this model system, Owen's group identified critical functional roles for genes such as MYC, RAC and MTOR. Additionally, the use of this and other models has allowed Owen's group to identify potential chemoprevention strategies. For example, the group's work on aspirin showed that embryonic and perinatal exposure to aspirin suppresses neoplasia associated with the loss of Apc function.

=== Neutrophils in colorectal and other cancers ===
Owen's group showed that neutrophils are associated with the earliest stage of CRC, and using mouse models they showed that inhibition of the chemokine receptor CXCR2 could suppress both colitis and spontaneous cancer. This was confirmed by the Dubois group in 2013. Owen's group continued these studies into the pancreas to show that inhibition of CXCR2 suppresses metastasis in pancreatic cancer.

=== The cell of origin of colorectal cancer ===
In collaboration with Hans Clevers's laboratory, Owen's group showed that Lgr5-positive cells are an efficient cell of tumourigenesis. Within the same study, they also showed that non-stem cells lacking APC could form lesions but would rarely progress. Following on from these studies, the group worked with Florian Greten's laboratory to show that additional mutations can cause an expansion in the cell of origin. This work built upon work in Owen's laboratory on understanding the cooperation of APC with mutations in other genes such as KRAS and PTEN.

=== Key regulators of metastasis ===
Owen's group has developed models of metastatic disease and identified critical components of the metastatic pathway, which has led to the design of trials specifically aimed at targeting metastatic disease in pancreatic cancer, e.g. Dasatanib in resectable pancreatic cancer patients. The group also provided definitive functional information on the role of mutant p53 in metastasis and mechanisms behind the process: integrin recycling, LOX, RHO The group also identified critical roles for RAC and its GEFs in melanoma migration and metastasis.

== Awards and honours ==
In 2007, Owen won the Young Scientist Frank Rose Award in recognition of his contributions to translational cancer research and in 2012 he was awarded the CRUK Future Leaders in Cancer Research Prize for his contributions to cancer research. He was also elected a Fellow of the Royal Society of Edinburgh in 2012 and a Fellow of the Academy of Medical Sciences in 2017.
