= George Beatson =

British physician (1848–1933)

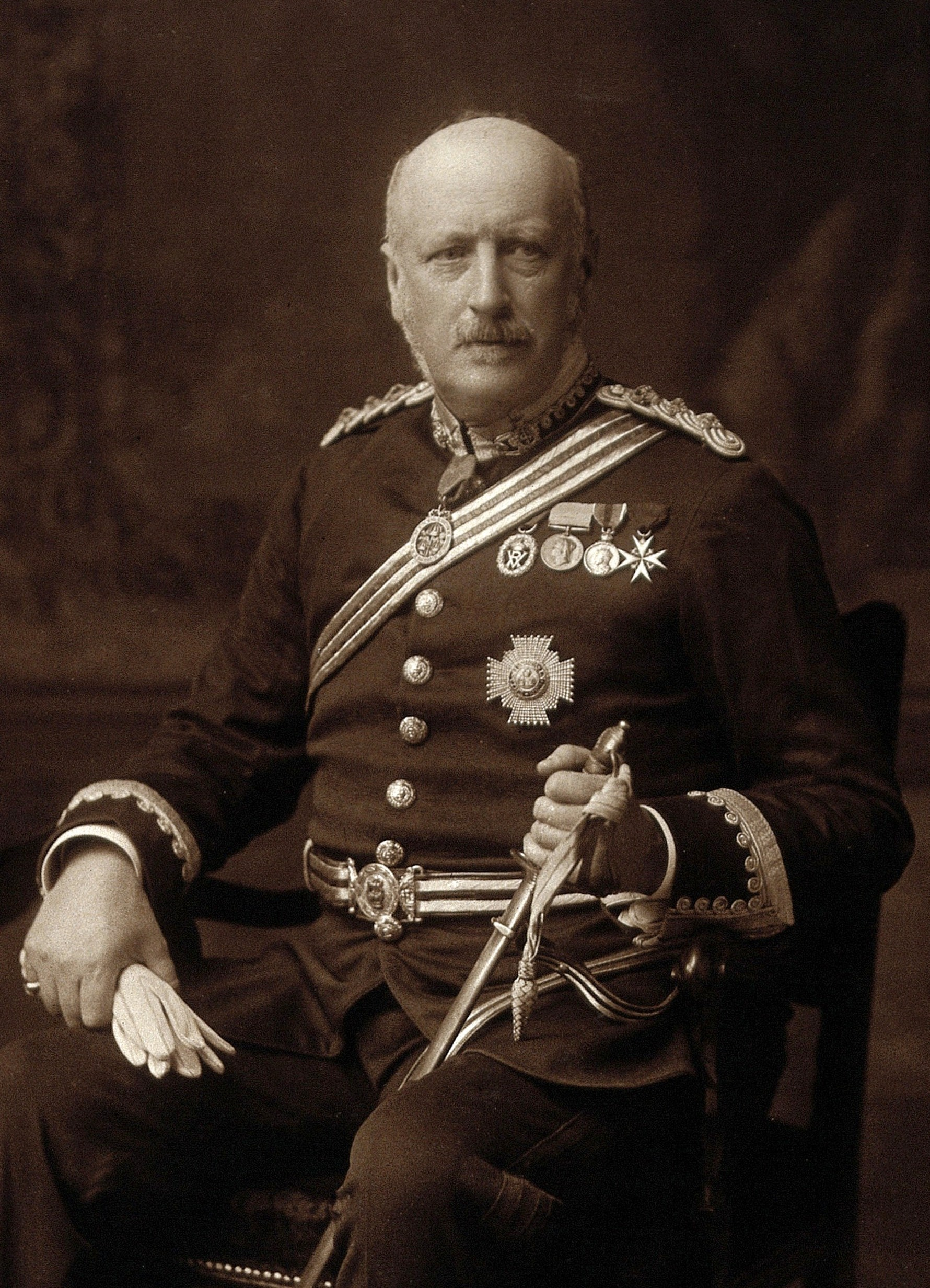
George Thomas Beatson

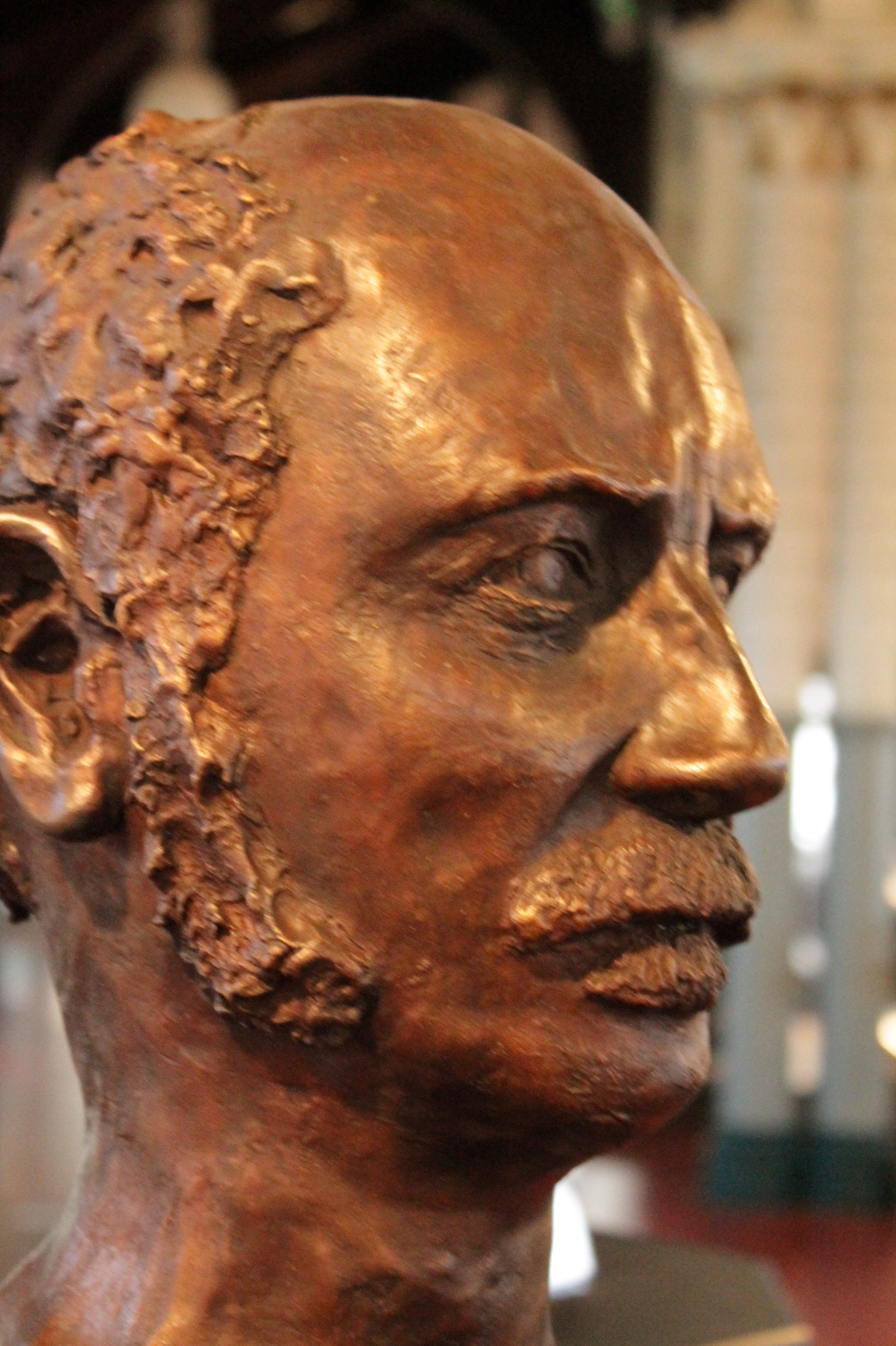
Bust of George Beatson, Hunterian Museum, Glasgow

Colonel Sir George Thomas Beatson KCB KBE DL (26 May 1848 – 16 February 1933) was a British physician. He was a pioneer in the field of oncology, developing a new treatment for breast cancer, and has been called "the father of endocrine ablation in cancer management." The Beatson West of Scotland Cancer Centre and the Cancer Research UK Beatson Institute are named for him.

== Biography ==
Beatson was born in Trincomalee, Sri Lanka, which was then part of the British Empire and known as Ceylon. His father was George Stewart Beatson, Honorary Physician to Queen Victoria and Surgeon General to the Indian Army. Beatson moved to Scotland as a boy, and grew up in Campbeltown. He was educated at King William's College, on the Isle of Man, and went on to Clare College, Cambridge, where he graduated BA in 1871. In 1874 he graduated from the University of Edinburgh. He then studied medicine, examining the links between ovulation, lactation and cancer for his thesis. He graduated MD in 1878. He then spent time working for Joseph Lister, the pioneer of antiseptic surgery, who was then the university's Professor of Surgery.

By 1878 Beatson had moved to Glasgow where he established a medical practice. He also joined the 1st Lanark Artillery, a unit of the Volunteer Forces which later became the Territorial Army. He was appointed assistant Professor of Surgery at Glasgow's Western Infirmary, and in 1893 he became a consulting surgeon at the Glasgow Cancer and Skin Institution. This was renamed the Glasgow Cancer Hospital in 1894, with Beatson as director. Beatson established an innovative domiciliary service, which supplied nursing care to patients in their own homes.

In 1896 he published a paper entitled On Treatment of Inoperable Cases of Carcinoma of the Mamma: Suggestions for a New Method of Treatment, with Illustrative Cases. This detailed his pioneering treatment of three patients with advanced breast cancer through bilateral oophorectomy (removal of the ovaries). Although he did not perform the operation again, oophorectomy became the standard treatment for advanced breast cancer over the following years. He is considered the father of anti-hormonal treatment of breast cancer since he was the first to describe remissions of metastatic breast cancer after this operation.

Meanwhile, he continued his involvement with the Volunteer Army, taking charge of the Glasgow Companies of the Volunteer Medical Corps in 1890. In 1908, he was appointed Principal Medical Officer to the Lowland Division of the Scottish Territorial Forces. He rose to the rank of lieutenant colonel, and was honorary colonel of the Army Medical Corps (Volunteer). Beatson was also involved with the St. Andrew's Ambulance Association, and he helped to establish the Scottish Red Cross. Beatson's professorship ended in 1913 when he was succeeded by Prof George Henry Edington, who also continued many of Beatson's secondary roles.

Beatson received many honours and decorations. In 1882 he was elected a member of the Harveian Society of Edinburgh and served as president in 1913. He was made a Companion of the Bath (CB) in 1902, and a Knight Commander of the Bath (KCB) in 1907. His work for the Red Cross was recognized by a KBE and the British War Medal. Raymond Poincaré, president of the French Republic, when in Glasgow in 1919 decorated him with the Officer's Cross of the Legion of Honour. He also received the decoration of Officer of the Crown of Belgium, and served as a Deputy Lieutenant of the County of the City of Glasgow. Beatson was a member of the Royal Scottish Automobile Club, although he used to arrive at meetings by horse and carriage. He died unmarried at the age of 84.

In 1948, the Glasgow Cancer Hospital was renamed the Royal Beatson Memorial Hospital in his honour. The institution is now known as the Beatson West of Scotland Cancer Centre. In 1967, the research department of the hospital became the Beatson Institute for Cancer Research (renamed the Cancer Research UK Beatson Institute in 2013). The institute is funded by Cancer Research UK and is based in Bearsden.

== Bibliography ==
- Beatson, GT (January 1880). "Practical Papers on the Materials of the Antiseptic Method of Treatment. 1. On Carbolic Acid as Used in Lister's Antiseptic System". Glasgow Medical Journal. 13 (1): 1–13. PMC 5893123. PMID 30433258.
