= Margaret Frame (biologist) =

Professor of Molecular Cell Biology

Margaret Frame OBE is a British biologist. She is the Professor of Cancer Biology and Science Director of Cancer Research Centre at the University of Edinburgh. She is also Director of MRC Institute of Genetics & Molecular Medicine. She has made seminal contributions to understanding mechanisms of cell adhesion and motility. She previously served as deputy-director of the Beatson Institute in Glasgow.

== Education ==
Frame graduated with a first class honours BSc in Biochemistry, followed by a PhD from the Medical Faculty, at the University of Glasgow.

== Career ==
Margaret Frame worked for a brief period in industry, before joining the MRC Virology Unit in Glasgow as a post-doctoral scientist. In 1991 she started work at the Beatson Institute for Cancer Research, first as a post-doc and subsequently as a group leader. In 1995, she was jointly appointed as Professor of Cancer Research in the Faculty of Biological Sciences at the University of Glasgow and the Beatson Institute, where she became Deputy Director in 2002.

In October 2007 she joined the new MRC-University of Edinburgh Institute of Genetics and Molecular Medicine. She co-directs the Edinburgh Cancer Research Centre in Edinburgh University’s College of Medicine and Veterinary Medicine, with the role of Science Director in the Cancer Research UK Centre (established January 2010). The vision of the Edinburgh Cancer Research Centre is to develop novel and emerging technologies for the development of innovative cancer discovery and translational science. Together with colleagues, she formed the Edinburgh Cancer Discovery Unit, which aims to generate evidence-led tests for cancer therapeutics and combinations that will predict clinical efficacy.

== Research ==
Margaret Frame’s long-held research interests are in cancer invasion and metastasis, and the role of tyrosine kinases in controlling tumour cell spread. She has had several CR-UK funded programs of research to work on understanding cancer invasion and metastasis and was awarded a European Research Council Advanced Investigator grant to build a novel cancer discovery platform. Her main goal is to work with clinicians treating cancers of unmet need, to determine whether targeting the invasive and metastatic processes may be of therapeutic benefit, and may be monitored in the preclinical and clinical settings by novel imaging techniques.

Her research group works on cell adhesion networks in cancer, with specific focus on the regulation and role of the adhesion-linked ‘nodal’ Tyrosine Kinases, and their extensive network of interacting partners. In particular Src and FAK kinases reside at sites of cell interaction with the environment or neighbouring cells, and her group is studying their wider cellular roles. They are also studying other proteins that have cancer-specific adaptor functions because they interact with the Src/FAK pathway in adhesion-regulated complexes, or they function in invasion or metastasis. Typically, these proteins regulate a variety of processes that lie at the heart of cancer, epithelial plasticity, epithelial to mesenchymal transition (EMT), loss of tissue regulation and tissue architecture, self-renewing properties, resistance to therapy, invasion and metastasis and host-tumour interactions.

Her group has shown that the FERM domain of FAK interacts with key regulators of directional migration and cancer cell polarity, and that tumour progression requires FAK in multiple epithelial cancer types. They have also demonstrated that Src inhibition suppresses metastasis in a genetically engineered mouse model of pancreatic cancer, and have been able to generate extremely useful cells from cancer models that are FAK deficient, and which can be reconstituted with wild-type FAK or signalling mutants. These have allowed the group to determine the role of signalling through FAK, from integrins and from the upstream Src kinases, and via FAK’s kinase activity, in maintaining aspects of the cancer phenotype. These have led to several findings on control of E-cadherin dynamics in vitro and in vivo, and on proliferation in 3-dimensional environments. Perhaps the most striking new finding from their genetic deletion studies (in both cells and animal tissues), has been that integrin signalling through the Src/FAK axis regulates autophagy in advanced cancer cells.

Margaret Frame's research group is now working with Professor Valerie Brunton, extending her research into glioblastoma to find out how these same networks are involved in this complex disease. A major part involves studying glioblastoma stem cells looking for differences in their adhesion networks, how these may play a role in the disease and how glioblastoma stem cells interact with immune cells and influence their surroundings. Through this work, they also hope to reveal new drug targets.

== Awards and honours ==
Margaret Frame was awarded the Tenovus Medal in 1999 for her work on Src family kinases, was elected a Fellow of the Royal Society of Edinburgh in 2002, an EMBO Member in 2008 and a Fellow of the Academy of Medical Sciences in 2010.

She was awarded an OBE in the New Years Honours of 2018 for services to cancer research.
