= Andrew Biankin =

Australian clinician-scientist (born 1965)

Andrew Biankin AO
- Born: 12 August 1965 (age 61); Sydney
- Years active: 1990s-present

Andrew Victor Biankin AO is a Scotland-based Australian clinician-scientist, best known for his work on enabling precision oncology in learning healthcare systems by integrating discovery, preclinical and clinical development to accelerate novel therapeutic strategies, and developing standardised pan-cancer assays for use by healthcare systems and researchers worldwide.

Biankin, who works as the Regius Professor of Surgery at the University of Glasgow, was made an Officer of the Order of Australia (AO) in the Queen's Birthday Honours List for 2019, for distinguished service to medical research, and to the treatment of pancreatic cancer, as a clinician-scientist.

Biankin is a Fellow of the Royal Society of Edinburgh and a Fellow of the Academy of Medical Sciences. He has written over 160 articles in major medical journals relating to cancer, genomics and precision medicine.

== Career ==
The eldest of three sons, Biankin was born in Sydney's western suburbs where his immigrant parents introduced him to projects on their weekend farm.

Initially enrolling in a pharmacy degree in 1983, Biankin then transferred to medicine the following year, graduating with his medical degree from the University of New South Wales in 1992.

During his medical degree, he took a year off to do a science research degree, and in another year's ‘sabbatical’, learned to play the violin.

His medical internship was followed by an intensive period in the emergency department of a large Sydney hospital where his surgical skills were in constant demand. Completing his surgical training, Biankin began to specialise in surgery for pancreatic cancer. Experiencing the unpredictability of pancreatic cancer and the high mortality rate of pancreatic cancer patients, he decided to conduct research in pancreatic cancer at the Garvan Institute of Medical Research in Sydney under Professor Rob Sutherland, Director of the Cancer Research Program.

His PhD project was an early personalised medicine approach that looked at why patients respond differently to treatment, despite the similarity of the tumours under the microscope. He continued to hone his surgical skills in the clinic. He finished his PhD in translational research at the end of 2002.

== Translational research ==
Following a postdoctoral position at Johns Hopkins University, USA, to further develop his scientific skills, he returned to Sydney in 2004 to establish a pancreatic cancer program at the Garvan Institute, setting up the New South Wales Pancreatic Cancer Network and then the Australian Pancreatic Cancer Network. With senior surgeon Dr Neil Merrit, Biankin established a hepatobiliary unit at Bankstown Hospital, Sydney, and in 2007, with a focus on translational research, began integrating this clinical practice with emerging precision oncology research.

In 2009, Biankin and Sean Grimmond established the Australian Pancreatic Cancer Genome Initiative (APGI) – the pancreatic cancer arm of the International Cancer Genome Consortium (ICGC). The APGI went on to map and upload the complete DNA read-outs for around 400 pancreatic cancers to the ICGC project, making it one of the largest sets of whole genome sequences for any cancer type. This work took pancreatic cancer from one of the least genetically characterised cancers to one of the best.

As part of this work, they received a A$30M infrastructure grant to conduct genomic sequencing in Australia to address issues in pancreatic cancer and to develop the pathways and the questions that could be addressed to understand the underlying molecular complexity and variability of pancreatic cancer and what was clinically and translationally relevant, and look for new targets for future therapies.

== Pan-cancer assays ==
Following the death of his mentor, Sutherland, from pancreatic cancer in 2012, Biankin focused on analytics and the importance of developing a molecular diagnostic/prognostic test that could guide treatment and the placement of patients into clinical trials. To this end, Biankin co-founded Cure Forward in the USA, where he was the chief medical and scientific advisor from 2012 until 2017, but encountered issues of the reliability, timeliness and cost of existing tests and scalability.

In 2013, as Regius Professor of Surgery, Biankin also took up the Directorship of the Wolfson Wohl Cancer Research Centre at the University of Glasgow, and established the Glasgow Precision Oncology Laboratory (GPOL) in 2016 to develop a molecular test to drive his planned precision oncology clinical trials program for pancreatic cancer – Precision-Panc.

Analysing data from ICGC and The Cancer Genome Atlas, Biankin and his team realised it would be possible to design a molecular/genomic test for 95% of solid tumours across the range of cancers and in 2019 the Glasgow Cancer Test was released for assessment in the real-world setting of the NHS and from November 2019 became available for research, including for clinical trials, from Agilent Technologies, which holds a non-exclusive global distribution licence. There is also a Glasgow Cancer Test for haematological cancers.

== Learning healthcare systems ==
The Glasgow Cancer Test was designed to be affordable for use in a public healthcare system and requires no special preparation of samples. As part of embedded research in a learning healthcare system, standardised broad genomic profiling, such as the Glasgow Cancer Test, can provide the large datasets that researchers need to continually refine current treatments and develop new ones as part of precision medicine.

Biankin has said that "While this is an entirely new way of looking at the world of drug development and delivery, there are no options. The pressures of an ageing population mean that we must rethink the way we approach healthcare." "Finding the right way for precision medicine to work in healthcare systems is a bit like breaking a wartime code – the stakes are high and time is against us. Breaking the cancer code that connects the cancer genomes to the patient's treatment is what drives me as a scientist and a doctor."

== Global data sharing ==
In 2018 Biankin took over as Executive Director and Chairman of the International Cancer Genome Consortium and set about developing the Accelerated Research for Genomic Oncology (ICGC-ARGO) initiative.

ICGC is an international network of cancer clinicians, researchers and clinical trials groups and the ARGO initiative aims to capture and aggregate the rich, longitudinal, clinical data of some 200,000 people to provide a million patient-years of precision oncology knowledge in a manner that allows for broad, but ethically responsible, data sharing and research.

The aim with ICGC-ARGO is to change culture and practice on an international level with support for the embedding of clinical trials in learning health systems and the development of a standardised assays used in the clinical trials of the consortium to produce rich comparable and shareable longitudinal data globally
