= Allan Balmain =

Scottish academic

Professor Allan Balmain FRS FRSE
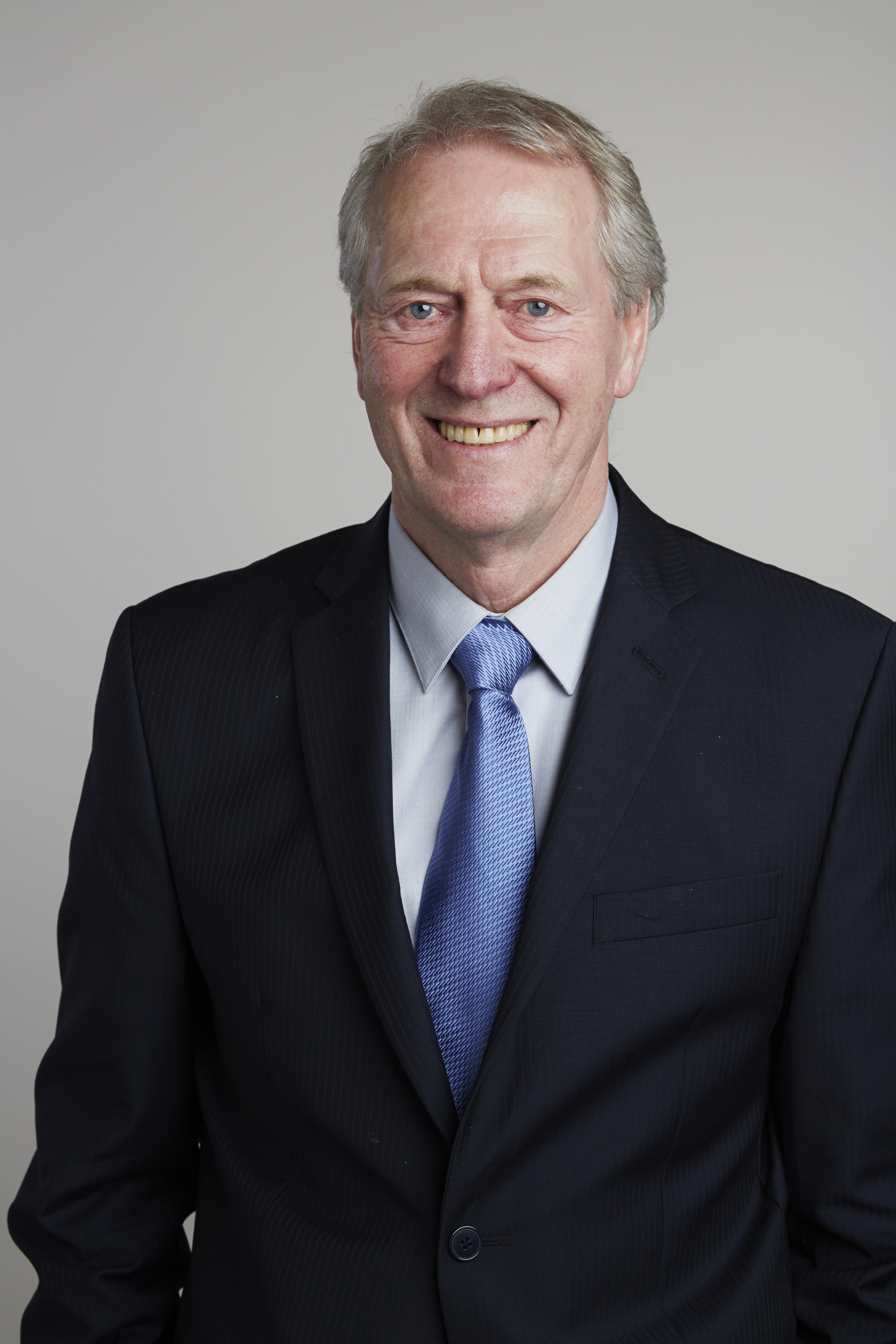
- Balmain in 2015
- Education: University of Glasgow
- Awards: FRS (2015); FRSE (1995)
- Scientific career
- Fields: Cancer; Genetics
- Workplaces: University of California, San Francisco; University of Strasbourg; German Cancer Research Center; Beatson Institute for Cancer Research; University of Glasgow
- Thesis: Studies in the diterpenoid field (1969)
- Website: profiles.ucsf.edu/allan.balmain; cancer.ucsf.edu/research/balmain-lab; cancer.ucsf.edu/people/profiles/balmain_allan.3777

British academic Allan Balmain is a Distinguished Professor of Cancer Genetics at the University of California, San Francisco, US (UCSF).

== Education ==
Balmain was educated at the University of Glasgow where he was awarded a Bachelor of Science degree in chemistry in 1966, followed by a PhD on the organic chemistry of terpenoids in 1969.

== Awards and honours ==
Balmain was elected a Fellow of the Royal Society of Edinburgh (FRSE) in 1995.

He was elected a Fellow of the Royal Society (FRS) in 2015. His certificate of election reads:

Allan Balmain has pioneered the use of the mouse as a model system for understanding the complexity of cancer at a genetic, molecular and cellular level. Through his novel and creative experiments he established the first molecular link between cancer initiation and carcinogen exposure, identified how specific genetic events lead to malignant progression and made major advances in our understanding of cancer susceptibility. Balmain's wide-ranging, innovative use of mouse genetics has generated new approaches for visualizing the genetic architecture of cancer pathways and the roles of complex network interactions in determining an individual's cancer susceptibility.
