= Andrew Watt Kay =

Scottish professor of surgery

Sir Andrew Watt Kay FRSE, FRCPSG FRCSEd
- Born: 14 August 1914; Ayr, Scotland
- Died: 1 February 2011 (aged 96); Paisley, Scotland
- Education: Ayr Academy
- Alma mater: University of Glasgow
- Occupation: Professor
- Known for: Kay's augmented histamine test
- Spouses: Janet Roxburgh (m. 1943; died 1990) Phyllis Gilles (m. 1992)

Sir Andrew Watt Kay (14 August 1914 – 1 February 2011) FRSE, FRCPSG, FRCSEd was a Scottish academic surgeon who was Regius Professor of Surgery at the University of Glasgow from 1964 to 1981. He developed the augmented histamine test, which bore his name, and was widely used in the investigation and treatment of peptic ulcer disease. He was knighted for services to surgery. From 1972 to 1974 he served as president of the Royal College of Physicians and Surgeons of Glasgow.

== Early life ==
Andrew Watt Kay was born on 14 August 1914 in Newton-On-Ayr, Scotland. Both his parents were pharmacists in Ayr. He was educated at Ayr Academy, and was dux of the school, going on to study medicine at the University of Glasgow where he graduated MB ChB with honours in 1939. He was awarded the Brunton Memorial Prize as the most distinguished graduate in medicine for that year.

== Early career ==
He worked as house surgeon at the Western Infirmary, Glasgow under A. J. Hutton. From 1942 he worked as assistant to the Regius Professor of Surgery, Professor Sir Charles Illingworth. As a result of research carried out in Illingworth's department he went on in 1944 to gain the degree of MD for which he was awarded the Bellahouston Gold Medal. In 1949 he was awarded a second higher degree ChM (Master of Surgery). He undertook military service in 1946 in the Royal Army Medical Corps (RAMC). He was given charge of the RAMC's surgical department at Queen Alexandra Military Hospital, Millbank, London.

== Research into gastric acid ==
After the war Kay returned to a surgical post at the Western Infirmary, and began research into the cause of peptic ulcer disease which was a major clinical problem in Western societies. He studied the secretion of gastric acid, thought at that time to be the most important factor in the development of duodenal ulcers. Kay used increasing doses of histamine to stimulate acid production and found that acid production was higher in patients with duodenal ulcer than in healthy controls. This test became known as Kay's augmented histamine test. It became widely used in the investigation and management of peptic ulcers. His paper describing this test, Effect of Large Doses of Histamine on Gastric Secretion of HCl, became the single most cited paper in the British Medical Journal between 1945 and 1989. Before the test each subject was given an antihistamine which blocked all of the effects of histamine apart from its effect on gastric acid secretion. This observation formed the basis for the work of Sir James Black in developing drugs which selectively blocked the effect of histamine in stimulating gastric acid production. These became known as H2 receptor antagonists.

== Later career ==
He became consultant surgeon in charge of wards at the Western Infirmary in 1956 and two years later was appointed to the chair of surgery at the University of Sheffield. Kay left his post in 1964 to become the Regius Professor of Surgery at the University of Glasgow. He remained in this post until he retired in 1981.

His Textbook of Surgical Physiology, written jointly with R. A. Jamieson, was first published in 1958 and ran to four editions, the last published in 1988.

== Honours and awards ==
In 1970 he was elected a member of the Harveian Society of Edinburgh. In 1971 he was elected a fellow of the Royal Society of Edinburgh. He was president of the Royal College of Physicians and Surgeons of Glasgow from 1972 to 1974. In 1973 he was knighted for his services to surgery. From 1973 to 1981, he served part-time as chief scientist at the Scottish Home and Health Department.

== Family and later life ==
He married Janetta Roxburgh in 1943. They had four children. After her death in 1990, he married Phyllis Gilles in 1992. Kay died in Paisley in 2011.
