= Learning health systems =

Type of health care system

Learning health systems (LHS) are health and healthcare systems in which knowledge generation processes are embedded in daily practice to improve individual and population health. The concept of a learning health system was formally introduced in 2006 by the Institute of Medicine—now the National Academy of Medicine (NAM)--in the charter of what is now the NAM Leadership Consortium. The charter defined a learning health system as "One in which science, informatics, incentives, and culture are aligned to support continuous improvement, innovation, and equity, with best practices and discovery seamlessly embedded in the delivery process, individuals and families active participants in all elements, and new knowledge generated as an integral byproduct of the delivery experience."

The impetus for introduction of the concept was the realization that over time, developments in digital technology and artificial intelligence, then still in relatively early stages, would completely transform medical care, health research, and health progress from a series of discoveries applied in a sequential and linear fashion into a continuous and ongoing process of improvement through lessons derived in the natural course of the care process.

Serving as the focus for the 2006 US Institute of Medicine Annual Meeting, this concept and definition has guided two decades of work. In conjunction with the promise envisioned for the introduction of electronic health records, various assessments identified the potential for more rapid learning in health care and health research. The NAM itself launched the Learning Health System Series of publications, numbering 33 as of 2026 and reviewing topics such as health data, research, costs, and outcomes.

As the level of interest and activity grew related to the Learning Health System in 2013, the NAM published the seminal report, “Best Care at Lower Cost: the Path to Continuously Learning Health Care in America.” [9] Summarizing the heretofore efforts, McGinnis and colleagues enumerate key milestones in the evolution of the LHS that include these reports as well as decades-old efforts to generate evidence from routine health care delivery. There has since been increasing interest in the topic, including the creation of the Wiley journal Learning Health Systems.

Cornerstone elements of the LHS include:

1. generation, application, and improvement of scientific knowledge;
2. an organizational infrastructure that supports the engagement of communities of patients, healthcare professionals and researchers who collaborate to identify evidence gaps that could be addressed through research in routine healthcare settings;
3. deployment of computational technologies and informatics approaches that organize and leverage large electronic health data sets, i.e. "big data" for use in research;
4. quality improvement at the point of care for each patient using new knowledge generated by research.

Other compatible ways of describing the LHS co-exist alongside the NAM definition, including the definition used by AHRQ, the Agency for Healthcare Research and Quality. AHRQ defines a learning health system as "a health system in which internal data and experience are systematically integrated with external evidence, and that knowledge is put into practice. As a result, patients get higher quality, safer, more efficient care, and health care delivery organizations become better places to work."

In 2023, the NAM established 10 Shared Commitments of learning health organizations to serve as a unifying touchstone for the field. The principles reflect and build upon the six aims of the seminal "Crossing the Quality Chasm" report published in 2001 (safe, equitable, effective, efficient, timely, and patient-centered), and account for the ways in which health care has evolved since the publication of this 2001 report.

- Engaged - Informed engagement, options, and choices for those who are served
- Safe - Tested and up-to-date protocols to protect from harm
- Effective - Evidence-based services tailored to understanding of each person's goals
- Fair- Parity in opportunity to attain desired health and goals
- Efficient - Optimal outcomes for accessible, non-wasteful resources
- Accessible - Effective services readily available where and when they are most needed
- Measurable - Reliable and valid assessment of consequential activities and outcomes
- Transparent - Clear information related to the nature, use, costs, and results of services
- Secure - Validated access and use safeguards for digitally-mediated activities
- Adaptive - Continuous learning and improvement are integral to organizational culture

== History ==
The NAM's early efforts to develop the ideas underpinning the LHS began in 2006, via a series of workshops held over several years from 2006-2013. Among several early publications to express the need for a rapid learning health system was a commentary in Health Affairs in 2007 where Lynn Etheredge applied the term "rapid learning health system" in recognition of the opportunity to leverage electronic health records (EHR) to "learn" what works in health care. The series of NAM workshops generated several summary publications on topics under the mantle of the LHS, including publications focused on the digital infrastructure as well as on ethical considerations. The Joseph H. Kanter Foundation fostered a related effort to build a learning health community, holding a summit in 2012 to establish Consensus LHS Core Values.

Nomenclature may vary in reference to the LHS concept. Some refer to a learning healthcare system, others refer to learning health systems or collaborative learning health systems. The architecture and objectives are similar, irrespective of the label—addressing evidence gaps, harnessing data, and effectively utilizing the best evidence at the point of need. Related concepts include the use of real-world data to generate real-world evidence, and mobilizing computable biomedical knowledge.

Given that the LHS has an expansive definition and scope, many of the early adopters of this approach were health systems that also had embedded research capabilities, such as a formal department or institute. The Veterans Administration Health System, Group Health Cooperative, Kaiser Permanente and Geisinger Health System were among the vanguard organizations who also published insights from their experience of launching formal learning health system activities. Increasingly, academic health systems have taken up the principles and practices espoused by the earliest adopters.

== Adoption and spread ==
Early experiences with deploying the LHS have been instructive and have led to further adoption and spread. The LHS model is being applied in specific medical specialties such as pediatrics and oncology, and further examination of the environment and conditions that support learning have spurred development of increasingly detailed and specialized frameworks that can support further adoption and adaptation based on the needs, features, and capabilities of a particular health system.

Along with a growing body of peer-reviewed publications on the specific experience of different systems as they evolve toward continuous learning, review articles have been published to reflect on the growth of the LHS as a whole. A systematic review by Budrionis observed that the ability to evaluate how well an LHS improves outcomes was not well-explored in the literature. Subsequently, Platt examined progress of theories and implementation of the LHS, Nash focused a review on deployment of the LHS in primary care, and Ellis mapped empirical applications of the LHS. Easterling and colleagues (REF LHS 2022) proffer an elaborate taxonomy of LHS elements and use this to describe an LHS-IP, or "Learning Health System In Practice" as a model for health care systems who seek to become an LHS.

The motivations for applying LHS concepts are largely and logically focused on improving the quality of care. Exemplar organizations are numerous and growing and include both community-based health systems and university-based academic health systems/medical centers in the United States:

- Atrium Health/Advocate Aurora
- Baylor Scott & White Health
- Care South Carolina
- Cleveland Clinic
- Children's Hospital of Philadelphia
- Cincinnati Children's Hospital Medical Center
- Denver Health Medical Center
- Geisinger Health System
- HealthPartners
- Indiana University Health
- Kaiser Permanente
- Mayo Clinic
- Medstar Health
- Feinberg School of Medicine
- NYU Langone Health
- SSM Health
- Sutter Health
- Trillium Healthcare Institute for Better Health (Canada)
- University of Alabama at Birmingham School of Medicine
- Michigan Medicine
- UPMC
- Vanderbilt University Medical Center
- Veterans Administration Health System
- Wake Forest School of Medicine
- Washington University School of Medicine
- Weill Cornell Medicine

In many cases, these institutions are engaged in research activities such as the HCSRN, Clinical and Translational Science Awards (CTSA), and PCORnet where the LHS concepts are applied. The University of Michigan has also established a formal academic department, the Department of Learning Health Sciences. Alongside these exemplar organizations, related initiatives and consortia have been established in recent years. The Learning Health Community is an umbrella organization that has united many systems and health data organizations to develop shared principles and processes, and foster learning about the applications of technologies in the context of learning systems via a periodic virtual forum (LHS IT Forum). Given their centrality to the generation of health data and information, two of the largest EHR vendors have also created communities to support LHS: Cerner's Learning Health Network and Epic System's Health Research Network. Still, much of the LHS development has been concentrated in large academic medical centers and health systems with a sizable footprint. Masica notes that nearly 85% of more than 6000 hospitals in the US are categorized as community hospitals, and the ability to develop and implement an LHS may be more challenging due to workforce and other constraints.

Dissemination of the activities and experiences of learning health systems has been an instrumental aspect of their growth and spread. While peer-reviewed literature on the LHS appears in a variety of journals, the creation of Healthcare: the Journal of Delivery Science and Innovation and the Learning Health Systems Journal are dedicated to manuscripts that showcase the experience of those deploying or refining aspects of learning in real-world practices. Each has also published special issues with thematic emphases on LHS-related topics such as embedded research and ethical, legal, and social implications of the LHS. Another marker of the spread of the LHS is its international adoption. Australia, Canada, the United Kingdom and other countries are applying the LHS concepts, offering opportunities to compare and contrast global experiences and develop a richer picture of how the local context, structure of care delivery, and regulatory environment affect the ability to support continuous learning. Patient involvement in the LHS has grown, partly due to the establishment of the Patient-Centered Outcomes Research Institute, continued emphasis on shared decision-making, and the growing recognition of participatory medicine. However, the engagement of patients is not consistent across health systems and there is not a uniform template for patient engagement or approaches to educating patients about the value and significance of the LHS as a model for improving evidence-based care.

== Electronic health data as a central component to the LHS ==
A substantial body of research on learning health systems (LHSs) relies on electronic health records (EHRs) and addresses challenges associated with their use. EHRs were initially developed primarily to support the documentation and administration of clinical services, including billing and health insurance claims. The generation of detailed real-world clinical data is an important byproduct of their use in clinical care.

The LHS leverages a clinical lifecycle. Patient data is collected, which can then be amalgamated across multiple patients to identify, define, and analyze a problem or a gap in the application of evidence-based care. These are activities largely driven by healthcare professionals. With the support of technology (both computational and statistical), an analysis of the amalgamated data can result in new evidence. Such knowledge generation can then spur changes in clinical practice, and thus to new patient data being collected. This is the optimum for the LHS. However, dissemination of implementation of new evidence can be operationally and technically challenging in many settings, including the original health system that identified a problem based on their own clinical data.

McLachlan and colleagues (2018) suggest a taxonomy of nine LHS classification types:

1. Cohort identification looks for patients with similar attributes.
2. Positive deviance finds examples of better care against a benchmark.
3. Negative deviance finds examples of sub-optimal care.
4. Predictive patient risk modeling uses patterns in data to find groups at greater risk of adverse events.
5. Predictive care risk and outcome models identify situations that are at greater risk of poor care.
6. Clinical decision support systems use patient algorithms applied to patient data to make specific treatment recommendations.
7. Comparative effectiveness research determines the most effective treatments.
8. Intelligent assistance use data to automate routine processes.
9. Surveillance monitors data for disease outbreaks or other treatment issues.

== Synergy with other disciplines ==
The LHS is a multidisciplinary and multi-stakeholder model for improvement, wherein clinical practitioners, health system leaders, data analysts and health IT experts, operations personnel, and researchers bring requisite expertise to bear throughout the cycle of improving health and healthcare. In a complex healthcare environment, sustained engagement of all health system stakeholders is necessary to successfully identify and prioritize evidence gaps, develop suitable interventions, analyze insights from the interventions, and deploy resulting changes. Hence, many disciplines and scientific domains may contribute various types of subspecialty expertise including:

- Health Informatics
- Clinical Trials
- Data Science and Machine Learning
- Organizational Psychology
- Quality Improvement
- Implementation Research

== Training ==
As the LHS has matured, leaders and vanguard organizations have identified the requisite skills needed to lead and develop interventions that support learning. The Agency for Healthcare Research and Quality convened a technical expert panel in 2016 to identify core competencies, which yielded 33 competencies spanning seven domains. These competency domains are (1) Systems Science; (2) Research Questions and Standards of Scientific Evidence; (3) Research Methods; (4) Informatics; (5) Ethics of Research and Implementation in Health Systems; (6) Improvement and Implementation Science; (7) Engagement, Leadership, and Research Management. An 8th domain, Equity and Justice, was added in 2022 and a total of 38 competencies are now identified. These competencies form the backbone of a training program collaboratively funded by AHRQ and PCORI, two US funding agencies that also issue funding opportunities for LHS-related studies. A $40 million funding opportunity for mentored career development awards was issued in 2017 and 11 Centers of Excellence were awarded five years of federal funding in 2018 to support the training of clinician and research scientists to conduct patient-centered outcomes research within LHS.

The LHS Centers of Excellence funded in 2018 were:

1. A Chicago Center of Excellence in Learning Health Systems Research Training (ACCELERAT), Northwestern University, Chicago, Ill.
2. CATALyST: Consortium for Applied Training to Advance the Learning Health System with Scholars/Trainees, Kaiser Permanente Washington Research Institute, Seattle, WA.
3. Learning Health System Scholar Program at Vanderbilt University, Nashville, Tenn.
4. Leveraging Infrastructure to Train Investigators in Patient-Centered Outcomes Research in Learning Health System (LITI- PCORLHS), Indiana University School of Medicine, Indianapolis, Ind.
5. Minnesota Learning Health System Mentored Career Development Program (MN-LHS), University of Minnesota, Minneapolis, Minnesota.
6. Northwest Center of Excellence & K12 in Patient Centered Learning Health Systems Science, Oregon Health and Science University, Portland, Oregon.
7. PEDSnet Scholars: A Training Program for Pediatric Learning Health System Researchers, Children's Hospital of Philadelphia, Philadelphia, PA
8. Stakeholder-Partnered Implementation Research and Innovation Translation (SPIRIT) program, University of California Los Angeles, Los Angeles, California.
9. The Center of Excellence in Promoting LHS Operations and Research at Einstein/Montefiore (EXPLORE), Albert Einstein College of Medicine, Bronx, N.Y.
10. Transforming the Generation and Adoption of PCOR into Practice (T-GAPP), University of Pennsylvania, Philadelphia, PA.
11. University of California-San Francisco Learning Health System K12 Career Development Program, University of California San Francisco, San Francisco, California.

As the funding for the aforementioned Centers of Excellence concludes in 2023, a successor funding opportunity was created by AHRQ and PCORI to fund Learning Health System Embedded Scientist Training and Research (LHS E-STaR) Centers. Other similar training and fellowship programs have been offered by AcademyHealth via their Delivery System Science Fellowship program, Kaiser Permanente's Division of Research, and the Veterans Administration via the Seattle-Denver Center of Innovation. Program offerings and emphases vary from institution to institution, but all involve training and professional development in topics related to improving health systems and the ability to generate and learn from evidence. Articles describing multidisciplinary workforce training efforts was published as a supplement to the LHS Journal in 2022, including an experience report summarizing the collective insights from the 11 initially funded Centers of Excellence.

== Funding and financial support ==
Support for learning activities may be derived from federal, philanthropic, and other sources. Examples include the National Institutes of Health and AHRQ (federal); and the Robert Wood Johnson Foundation (philanthropic). The Patient-Centered Outcomes Research Institute (PCORI) has designated the realization of a national learning health system as one of their five national priorities for health, which is indicative of future funding opportunities. Funding provided to personnel within an organization (i.e., a health system) may be designated for internally-directed learning activities with no expectation about developing and publishing generalizable results. In this way, learning health system may be distinguished from traditional health services or informatics research and more closely resemble the funding and infrastructure that health systems designate for quality improvement activities. In 2015, the Centers for Medicare and Medicaid Services (CMS) funded the Health Care Payment Learning and Action Network to ascertain what works with respect to alternative health care delivery arrangements, however, reimbursement for learning activities from insurers/payers is not currently a steady avenue for financial support to incentivize health system learning.

== Ethical considerations ==
Bioethics scholars including Faden, Asch, Finkelstein, Morain, and Platt have averred that in a learning health system, consideration should be given to both clinical ethics and research ethics. Faden, Kass and colleagues have put forth an ethics framework for the learning health system that is anchored on seven essential obligations: (1) respecting dignity and rights of all patients; (2) respecting clinical judgment; (3) providing optimal care to every patient; (4) avoiding the introduction of non-clinical burdens and risks; (5) reducing health inequities; (6) ensuring responsible activities are conducted in a way that fosters learning; and (7) contributing to the overall aim of improving quality and value in health care. This framework and several companion articles were published as a special report from the Hastings Center. Subsequent articles by Finkelstein et al, as well as Asch and colleagues seek to use examples of learning activities as a means to describe different approaches to research oversight and compliance. Rigorous deliberations about the approach to informed consent are also germane to the ethics of learning activities in the healthcare context.

== See also ==
- Real World Evidence
