= John Burns (surgeon) =

Scottish surgeon

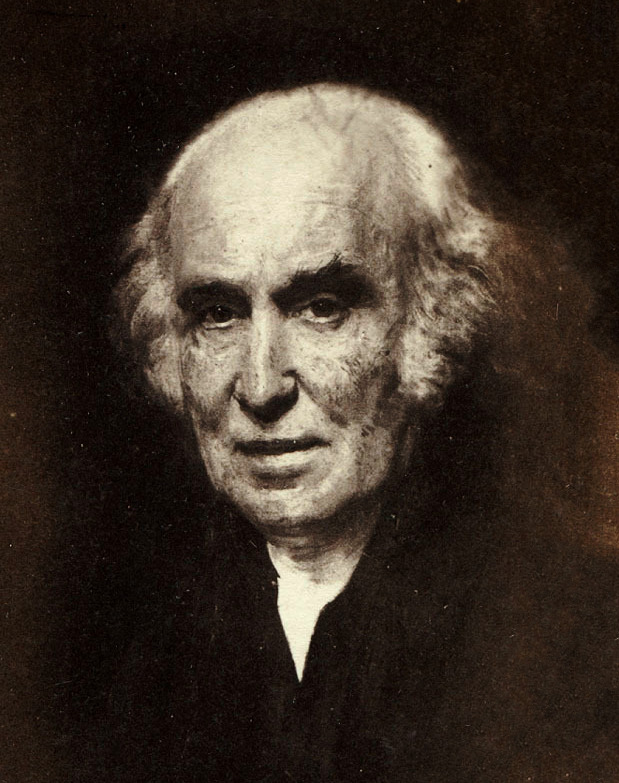
John Burns

John Burns FRS MIF (13 November 1775 – 18 June 1850) was a Scottish surgeon.

== Life ==
He was the eldest son of Elizabeth Stevenson and Rev. John Burns, who was the minister of the Barony Church in Glasgow.

Burns became a visiting surgeon at Glasgow Royal Infirmary and the proprietor of the College Street medical school. He was suspected in robbing graves to provide cadavres for dissecting studies. In 1799, he became Professor of Anatomy and Theory at Anderson's University, where he published several text books for students and became an international authority on abortion and midwifery.

In 1815 he was appointed the first Regius Professor of Surgery at the University of Glasgow.

He lived at 5 Blythswood Square in the north of the city.

Burns, the brother of two senior figures in the MacBrayne's and Cunard shipping businesses, was among fifty people who died when the G & J Burns paddle steamship Orion sank off Portpatrick in June 1850 on its way from Liverpool to Glasgow.

== Publications ==
- Principles of Midwifery (1809)
- Principles of Christian Philosophy
- Christian Fragments

== Family ==
In 1801 he married Isabella Duncan, daughter of Rev. John Duncan of Alva and had four children. Their first child, John (born 1806) was a member of the 78th Highlanders and later Lieutenant-Colonel of the 2nd Royals and died in service at the Cape in 1853, unmarried. Their second son, Allan (born 1819), was a physician and died in 1843 by typhoid fever which he caught from a patient.
