= Karen Vousden =

British medical researcher

Karen Vousden CBE FRS FRSE FMedSci
- Born: 19 July 1957 (age 69)
- Education: Queen Mary and Westfield College
- Known for: Work on p53 tumour suppressor protein and Mdm2 protein
- Spouse: Robert Ludwig (m. 1986)
- Awards: CBE (2010); FRS (2003); EMBO Member (2004); FRSE (2004); FMedSci
- Scientific career
- Fields: Cancer
- Workplaces: University of Glasgow; Francis Crick Institute; The Beatson Institute for Cancer Research; Cancer Research UK; Institute of Cancer Research; National Cancer Institute
- Thesis: Use of suppressor gene mutations to study transfer RNA redundancy in Coprinus (1982)

Karen Heather Vousden (born 19 July 1957) is a British medical researcher. She is known for her work on the tumour suppressor protein, p53, and in particular her discovery of the important regulatory role of Mdm2, an attractive target for anti-cancer agents. From 2003 to 2016, she was the director of the Cancer Research UK Beatson Institute in Glasgow, UK, moving back to London in 2016 to take up the role of Chief Scientist at CRUK and Group Leader at the Francis Crick Institute.

== Education ==
After attending Gravesend Grammar School for Girls, Vousden gained a Bachelor of Science degree in genetics and microbiology (1978) and a PhD from Queen Mary College, University of London on the use of suppressor gene mutations to study transfer RNA redundancy in the fungus Coprinus.

== Career ==
Vousden's early postdoctoral research positions were with Chris Marshall at the Institute of Cancer Research, London, UK (1981–85) and Douglas Lowy at the National Cancer Institute, Bethesda, United States (1985–87).

From 1987 to 1995, she led the Human Papillomavirus Group at the Ludwig Institute for Cancer Research, London, UK. In 1995, she joined the National Cancer Institute in Frederick, USA, serving successively as head of the Molecular Carcinogenesis section of the ABL-Basic Research Program (1995–97), director of the Molecular Virology and Carcinogenesis Laboratory (1997–98), interim director of the ABL-Basic Research Program (1998–99) and chief of the Regulation of Cell Growth Laboratory, Division of Basic Sciences (1999–2002).

From 2003 to 2016, she was the director of the Cancer Research UK Beatson Institute in Glasgow, UK, where she oversaw a £15 million expansion. She also led the institute's Tumour Suppression research group. She also served on the Life Sciences jury for the Infosys Prize in 2014.

Since 2016, she has moved back to London to take up the role of CRUK Chief Scientist and Group Leader at the Francis Crick Institute. In 2018, she was elected a foreign associate of the National Academy of Sciences.

== Research ==
=== Human papillomaviruses ===
Vousden's early work focused on the molecular biology of human papillomaviruses (HPVs), which are associated with cervical cancer. With Douglas Lowy and others, she pinpointed the specific viral oncoproteins required by HPV-16 to immortalise epithelial cells. She was also part of a group which showed that E6, one of the HPV-16 oncoproteins, binds to the human tumour suppressor protein p53 in vivo, resulting in its degradation.

=== p53 suppressor protein ===
Vousden's recent research has centred on p53, a gene which plays a critical role in preventing the development of tumours by inducing cells subject to stress, such as DNA damage, to commit suicide via the apoptosis mechanism. Her work has been important in delineating the mechanism of this process. With Katsunori Nakano, she discovered a key component in the apoptosis pathway triggered by p53, the protein PUMA (P53 Upregulated Modulator of Apoptosis).

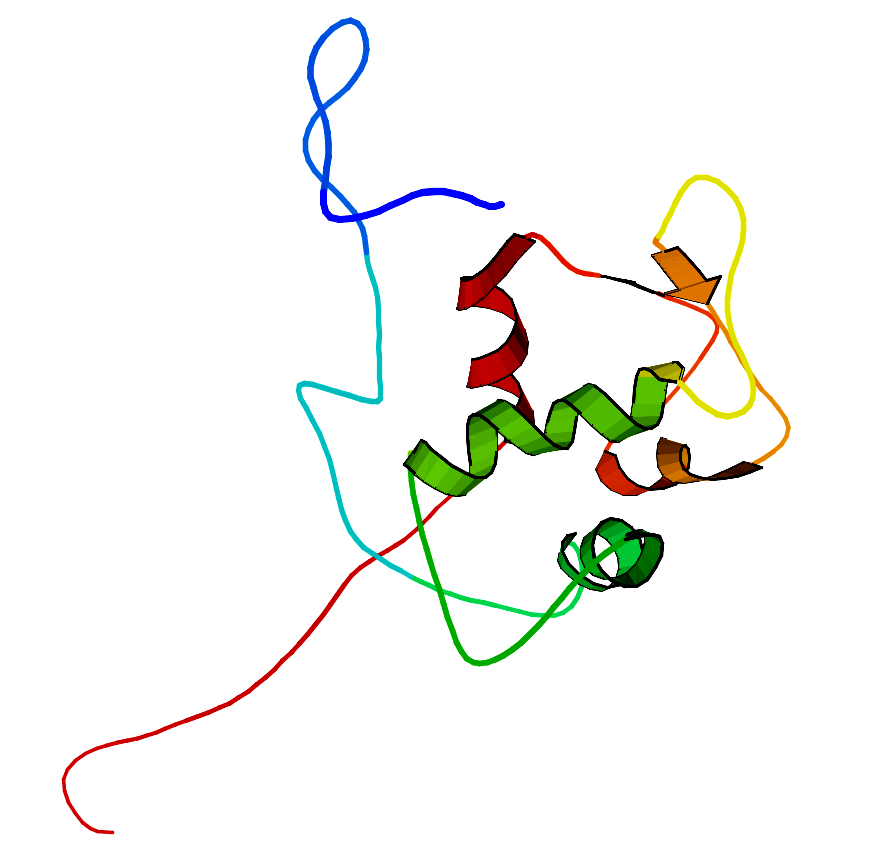
Structure of Mdm2

To prevent it being activated inappropriately, p53 is strictly controlled in the normal cell. Vousden discovered that a key element in this regulation is the protein Mdm2. With Allan Weissman and others, she showed that Mdm2 is a ubiquitin ligase which targets p53 for degradation by the proteasome, thus ensuring levels of the protein remain low when the cell is not under stress.

Reactivating p53 can inhibit the growth of some tumours, making Mdm2 an attractive target for cancer therapeutics. As Mdm2 targets only a small number of proteins for destruction, an inhibitor might have few side effects. A major focus of Vousden's recent work has been investigating the structure of Mdm2 and seeking molecules that inhibit it; a group of low-molecular-weight compounds (discovered in collaboration with the Department of Chemistry at the University of Glasgow) have recently shown promise in cell-culture studies. Mdm2 inhibitors have also been discovered by researchers at Hoffmann–La Roche and the Karolinska Institute.

p53 can also help to prevent or repair minor damage to the genome under conditions of low stress. Vousden's group have recently discovered a novel p53-regulated protein, TIGAR (T-p53 Inducible Glycolysis and Apoptosis Regulator), which can reduce oxidative stress in cells and might mediate part of this effect of p53.

=== Key publications ===
- Yee, KS; Vousden, KH (2005). "Complicating the complexity of p53". Carcinogenesis. 26 (8): 1317–1322. doi:10.1093/carcin/bgi122. PMID 15888490.
- Evan, GI; Vousden, KH (2001). "Proliferation, cell cycle and apoptosis in cancer" (PDF). Nature. 411 (6835): 342–348. Bibcode:2001Natur.411..342E. doi:10.1038/35077213. PMID 11357141. S2CID 4414024. Archived from the original (PDF) on 6 July 2011.
- Peters G, Vousden KH, eds. Oncogenes and Tumour Suppressors (Oxford University Press; 1997) (ISBN 0199635951)
- Wilson, JM; Henderson, G; Black, F; et al. (January 2007). ". (2007) Synthesis of 5-deazaflavin derivatives and their activation of p53 in cells". Bioorg Med Chem. 15 (1): 77–86. doi:10.1016/j.bmc.2006.10.011. PMID 17064912.
- Bensaad, K; Tsuruta, A; Selak, MA; et al. (2006). "TIGAR, a p53-inducible regulator of glycolysis and apoptosis". Cell. 126 (1): 107–120. doi:10.1016/j.cell.2006.05.036. PMID 16839880. S2CID 15006256.
- Nakano, K; Vousden, KH (2001). "PUMA, a novel proapoptotic gene, is induced by p53". Mol Cell. 7 (3): 683–694. doi:10.1016/S1097-2765(01)00214-3. PMID 11463392.
- Fang, S; Jensen, JP; Ludwig, RL; et al. (2000). "Mdm2 is a RING finger-dependent ubiquitin protein ligase for itself and p53". J Biol Chem. 275 (12): 8945–8951. doi:10.1074/jbc.275.12.8945. PMID 10722742.
- Kubbutat, MHG; Jones, SN; Vousden, KH (1997). "Regulation of p53 stability by Mdm2". Nature. 387 (6630): 299–303. Bibcode:1997Natur.387..299K. doi:10.1038/387299a0. PMID 9153396. S2CID 4329670.
- Hawley-Nelson, P; Vousden, KH; Hubbert, NL; et al. (1989). "HPV16 E6 and E7 proteins cooperate to immortalize human foreskin keratinocytes". EMBO J. 8 (12): 3905–3910. doi:10.1002/j.1460-2075.1989.tb08570.x. PMC 402081. PMID 2555178.

== Awards and honours ==
Vousden is a fellow of the Royal Society (2003), Royal Society of Edinburgh (2004) and the Academy of Medical Sciences (2006); she was also elected a member of the European Molecular Biology Organization in 2004. The Institute of Cancer Research awarded her an Honorary Doctorate in Science (Medicine) in 2006. She gave the Sir Frederick Gowland Hopkins Memorial Lecture of the Biochemical Society in 2008. She was awarded the Royal Medal from the Royal Society of Edinburgh in 2009. Vousden was appointed Commander of the Order of the British Empire (CBE) in the 2010 New Year Honours.

In 2004, The Scotsman named Vousden among the 25 most powerful Scottish women.

In 2021, Karen Vousden was recognized with the first Pezcoller Foundation-Marina Larcher Fogazzaro-EACR Women in Cancer Award.
