= DoCoMoMo Key Scottish Monuments =

DoCoMoMo Key Scottish Monuments is a list of 60 notable post-war buildings in Scotland, compiled in 1993 by the international architectural conservation organisation DoCoMoMo.

The buildings date from the period 1945–1970, and were selected by a panel as being significant examples of architectural style, building materials and location. The purpose was in part to raise the profile of post-war architecture, and to "demonstrate that architecture, as an art, flourished during those years". The list was the basis for an exhibition at the Royal Incorporation of Architects in Scotland, aimed at introducing some of these buildings as "heritage". The predominant view of post-war architecture, and of many modernist buildings in particular, was not favourable in the UK at the time, and the list was intended to inform the statutory listing of significant works. Some of the buildings, for example Notre Dame High School, had already been listed by Historic Scotland before the DoCoMoMo list was compiled, and several more have been designated since, including several at Category A, as "buildings of national or international importance".

The list includes a wide range of structures, from large industrial plants, to small private houses, and covers the diversity of building types that were constructed during the period. Not all the buildings have survived: two of the most prominent casualties have been Basil Spence's Hutchesontown C complex in Glasgow, demolished in 1993, and Gillespie, Kidd & Coia's St. Peter's Seminary in Cardross, which has been derelict since the late 1980s.

== List ==
Building	Location	Date	Architect	Notes
Anderston Centre Industrial Zone	Glasgow	1969	Jack Holmes and Partners	
Andrew Melville Hall of Residence, University of St Andrews	St Andrews	1967	James Stirling	Category A listed
Arts Tower and Faculty Building, University of Dundee	Dundee	1961	Robert Matthew, Johnson-Marshall and Partners	Category B listed
Avisfield	Cramond, Edinburgh	1957	Morris and Steedman	Category B listed
Bernat Klein House and Studio	Scottish Borders	1957 (house) 1972 (studio)	Peter Womersley	Both buildings Category A listed
Chessel's Court redevelopment	Royal Mile, Edinburgh	1966	Robert Hurd	Category A/B listed
Crathie Drive Development	Glasgow	1952	Ronald Bradbury	
Cruachan Power Station	Loch Awe, Argyll and Bute	1965	J Williamson (engineer)	
Cumbernauld New Town original housing areas (Kildrum, Park, Carbrain, Ravenswood, Seafar, Muirhead)	North Lanarkshire	1974	Cumbernauld Development Corporation and others	
Cumbernauld Town Centre Phase 1	Cumbernauld	1967	Geoffrey Copcutt	Partly demolished
Dollan Baths	East Kilbride	1968	A Buchanan Campbell	Category A listed
Dounreay Experimental Research Establishment	Highland	1958	R S Brocklesby	Currently being decommissioned
Dysart redevelopment (Phases 1–3)	Fife	1971	Wheeler and Sproson	
Eaglais Mathair nan Dorainn (Church of Our Lady of Sorrows)	Gearraidh na Monadh, South Uist	1965	Richard J McCarron	Category B listed
Falkirk and District Royal Infirmary, Ward Unit and Operating Theatre Suite	Falkirk	1966	Keppie, Henderson and Partners	
Fishermen's Houses	Dunbar, East Lothian	1952	Basil Spence	
Forth Road Bridge and Control Building	Firth of Forth	1964	Sir Giles Scott, Son and Partners, with Mott, Hay and Anderson (engineers)	Category A listed
Gallowgate redevelopment	Aberdeen	1966	G McI Keith, City Architect	
Glasgow Inner Ring Road, North and West Flanks	Glasgow	1971	Scott Wilson Kilpatrick (engineers), W Holford	Now part of the M8 motorway
Glasgow University Library and Hunterian Art Gallery	Glasgow	1965	William Whitfield	
Gray's School of Art	Aberdeen	1968	D Michael A Shewan	
Heddell's Park and Annsbrae Housing Scheme	Lerwick, Shetland	1959	Richard Moira and B L C Moira	
Heron House	Glasgow	1971	Derek Stephenson and Partners	Converted into The Pinnacle residential building in 2001
Hunterston A nuclear power station	North Ayrshire	1964	General Electric Company / Simon-Carves Ltd (design consortium) / Howard V Lobb and Partners (consulting architects)	
Hutchesontown Area 'C'	Gorbals, Glasgow	1966	Basil Spence	Demolished 12 September 1993
Kildrum Primary School	Cumbernauld	1962	Gillespie, Kidd & Coia	fire-damaged and subsequently demolished
Kincardine Power Station	Kincardine-on-Forth, Fife	1963	Robert Matthew, Johnson-Marshall and Partners	Demolished
Kirkcaldy Town House	Kirkcaldy, Fife	1956	David Carr	Category B listed, designed in the 1930s but not built until after WW2
Lanark County Buildings (now South Lanarkshire Council Headquarters)	Hamilton	1964	D G Bannerman	Category A listed
Leith Fort development	Leith, Edinburgh	1966	Shaw-Stewart, Baikie and Perry	Demolished 2012–2013
Lourdes Secondary School	Glasgow	1957	Thomas Cordiner	
Meadowside Granary Extension	Glasgow	1967	Clyde Navigation Trust / L G Mouchel and Partners	Demolished
Monktonhall Colliery	Newcraighall, East Lothian	1965	Egon Riss	Demolished
Moredun temporary housing area	Moredun, Edinburgh	1949	J A W Grant / City Architect / Sam Bunton	
Mortonhall Crematorium	Mortonhall, Edinburgh	1967	Basil Spence	Category A listed
National Library of Scotland	Edinburgh	1955	Reginald Fairlie	Category A listed, construction began in the 1930s, but not completed until after WW2
New Club	Princes Street, Edinburgh	1969	Alan Reiach	Category A listed
Notre Dame High School	Glasgow	1953	Thomas Cordiner	Category A listed, designed before the war
Paisley Civic Centre	Paisley, Renfrewshire	1971	Hutchison Locke and Monck	
Pathfoot Building, University of Stirling	Stirling	1967	Robert Matthew, Johnson-Marshall and Partners	Category A listed
Plant Houses, Royal Botanic Garden	Edinburgh	1967	George Pearce	Category A listed
Pollock Halls of Residence	Edinburgh	1959	Rowand Anderson, Kininmonth and Paul	Category A listed
Ravenscraig steelworks	Motherwell	1957	Colvilles/British Steel Corporation	Demolished 1993
Red Road development	Glasgow	1969	Sam Bunton and Associates	Demolished 2015
Robert the Bruce statue and rotunda	Bannockburn, Stirling	1964	Charles d'Orville Pilkington Jackson (sculptor)	Category A listed
Royal Commonwealth Pool	Edinburgh	1970	Robert Matthew, Johnson-Marshall and Partners	Category A listed
St. Bride's Church	East Kilbride	1964	Gillespie, Kidd & Coia	Category A listed, campanile demolished 1987
St. Lawrence's Church	Greenock	1954	Gillespie, Kidd & Coia	Category A listed
St. Paul's Church	Glenrothes, Fife	1957	Gillespie, Kidd & Coia	Category A listed
St. Peter's College	Cardross, Argyll and Bute	1966	Gillespie, Kidd & Coia	Category A listed, currently derelict
St. Peter's Street redevelopment	Peterhead, Aberdeenshire	1971	Baxter, Clark and Paul	Demolished
St. Teresa's Church	Glasgow	1960	Alexander McAnally and Partners	Category B listed
Scottish Provident Institution	St Andrew Square, Edinburgh	1969	Rowand Anderson, Kininmonth and Paul	Demolished in July 2014
Sighthill Health Centre	Sighthill, Edinburgh	1953	Robert Gardner-Medwin	
Smithycroft Road Secondary School	Glasgow	1967	A G Jury	Demolished
Stow College of Building and Printing and Stow College of Distributive Trades	Glasgow	1964	Wylie, Shanks and Underwood	Both Category B listed
Turnhouse Airport Terminal	Edinburgh Airport	1956	Robert Matthew	Demolished in 1995
University of Edinburgh redevelopment	George Square, Edinburgh	1967	Robert Matthew Johnson-Marshall, Basil Spence, Glover and Ferguson, and Reiach, Hall and Partners	
Transplantation Surgery Unit, Western General Hospital	Edinburgh	1963	Peter Womersley	
Vale of Leven Hospital	Alexandria, West Dunbartonshire	1955	Keppie, Henderson and Partners	
