= List of post-war Category A listed buildings in Scotland =

This is a list of Category A listed buildings in Scotland which date from after 1945 (the post-war period). The majority of these buildings are examples of Brutalist architecture or related modernist architecture which was ambitiously adopted by a number of Scottish architects, such as Sir Robert Matthew and Sir Basil Spence.

In Scotland, the term listed building refers to a building or other structure officially designated as being of "special architectural or historic interest". Category A structures are those considered to be "buildings of national or international importance, either architectural or historic, or fine little-altered examples of some particular period, style or building type." Listing was begun by a provision in the Town and Country Planning (Scotland) Act 1947, and the current legislative basis for listing is the Planning (Listed Buildings and Conservation Areas) (Scotland) Act 1997. The authority for listing rests with Historic Scotland, an executive agency of the Scottish Government, which inherited this role from the Scottish Development Department in 1991. Once listed, severe restrictions are imposed on the modifications allowed to a building's structure or its fittings. Listed building consent must be obtained from local authorities prior to any alteration to such a structure.

There are approximately 47,400 listed buildings and statues in Scotland, of which around 8% (some 3,600) are Category A. The number which date from post 1945 currently stands at 49, following the addition of the Cables Wynd House and Linksview House buildings in January 2017. The two oldest buildings in this list both commenced construction prior to World War II but completion then occurred in the post-war period, the buildings are generally considered post-war.

== Listed buildings ==
Name	Location	Date listed	Geo-coordinates	Notes	LB number	Image
St. Columba's Cathedral	Corran Esplanade, Oban, Argyll and Bute	20 July 1971	56°25′10″N 5°28′44″W	Sir Giles Gilbert Scott	38820	Upload another image See more images
Joseph Black Building	University of Glasgow, Gilmorehill Campus, Glasgow	15 January 1985	55°52′19″N 4°17′36″W	T Harold Hughes and DSR Waugh with later works by Alexander Waugh & Kay	32918	Upload another image
Lanark County Buildings (South Lanarkshire Council Headquarters)	Hamilton, Almada Street	18 November 1993	55°46′45″N 4°03′03″W	International modern tower by D G Bannerman, 1959–64	34472	Upload another image See more images
Easterheughs	Dalachy, Aberdour, Fife	24 March 2004	56°03′37″N 3°16′11″W	William Thomas	49686	Upload Photo
Holy Family Roman Catholic Church and Presbytery	Port Glasgow, Parkhill Avenue	23 September 2004	55°55′43″N 4°39′31″W	Gillespie, Kidd & Coia	40088	Upload another image
Pitlochry Power Station, dam and fish ladder	Loch Faskally, Pitlochry	20 December 2000	56°41′56″N 3°44′24″W	Harold Ogle Tarbolton	47534	Upload another image See more images
Notre Dame High School	160 Observatory Road, Dowanhill, Glasgow	28 July 1987	55°52′42″N 4°17′57″W	Thomas S Cordiner	32571	Upload another image
Robin Chapel	Thistle Foundation Estate, Niddrie, Edinburgh	14 June 2002	55°55′53″N 3°07′50″W	John F Matthew	48686	Upload another image
Sloy Power Station	Loch Sloy, Argyll and Bute	29 March 1996	56°15′40″N 4°45′52″W	Harold Ogle Tarbolton	43188	Upload another image See more images
Commando Memorial	Spean Bridge, Highland	5 October 1971	56°53′53″N 4°56′39″W	Scott Sutherland	6842	Upload another image See more images
HMSO Store, Sighthill	11 Bankhead Broadway, Sighthill Industrial Estate, Edinburgh	29 November 1990	55°55′27″N 3°17′46″W	Stewart Sim	30250	Upload Photo
St Laurence's RC Church and Presbytery	Kilmacolm Road, Greenock, Inverclyde	23 September 1994	55°56′24″N 4°44′45″W	Gillespie, Kidd & Coia	34184	Upload another image See more images
Crombie Halls of Residence	Meston Walk, Aberdeen	11 Nov 2004	57°09′50″N 2°06′15″W	Robert Matthew Johnson Marshall (Robert Matthew)	50016	Upload another image See more images
Former Lady and St Francis Secondary School	72 Charlotte Street, by Glasgow Green, Glasgow	4 September 1989	55°51′13″N 4°14′29″W	Gillespie, Kidd & Coia	32662	Upload another image See more images
St Paul's RC Church and Presbytery	Warout Road, Glenrothes, Fife	B 15 September 1987; A 28 September 2009	56°11′29″N 3°09′41″W	Gillespie, Kidd & Coia	10012	Upload another image See more images
High Sunderland	Selkirk, Scottish Borders	18 April 2007	55°34′49″N 3°07′03″W	Peter Womersley	50862	Upload another image
University of Edinburgh, Pollock Halls of Residence	Holyrood Park Road, Edinburgh	17 January 2006	55°56′17″N 3°10′13″W	Rowand Anderson, Kininmonth & Paul	50187	Upload another image See more images
Forth Road Bridge with Approach Ramps and Piers	Firth of Forth, between Edinburgh and Fife	21 March 2001	56°00′06″N 3°24′15″W	Mott, Hay and Anderson with Freeman Fox & Partners	47778	Upload another image See more images
St Columba's Parish Church	Church Street, Glenrothes, Fife	5 October 2004	56°11′43″N 3°10′43″W	Wheeler & Sproson	49999	Upload another image See more images
St Peter's College	Cardross	6 August 1992	55°58′13″N 4°38′26″W	Gillespie, Kidd & Coia	6464	Upload another image See more images
Ben Cruachan Hydro Electric Scheme, Turbine Hall	Ben Cruachan, Argyll and Bute	11 February 2011	56°24′23″N 5°06′47″W	J B Armstrong	51688	Upload Photo
40 George Square (Block A) and Lecture Block (Block B), University of Edinburgh	George Square, Edinburgh	17 January 2006	55°56′36″N 3°11′12″W	Robert Matthew Johnson Marshall (John Richards)	50189	Upload another image
St Mary's Roman Catholic Church	Camelon, Falkirk	23 September 1994	56°00′17″N 3°49′23″W	Gillespie Kidd and Coia	31252	Upload another image See more images
9 and 10 St Andrew Square	St Andrew Square, Edinburgh	28 March 1996	55°57′12″N 3°11′39″W	Basil Spence & Partners	43349	Upload another image
Dollan Aqua Centre	Town Centre Park, East Kilbride	13 June 2002	55°45′43″N 4°10′57″W	Alexander Buchanan Campbell	48682	Upload another image See more images
St Bride's Roman Catholic Church	Platthorn Drive, East Kilbride	23 September 1994	55°45′47″N 4°10′06″W	Gillespie, Kidd and Coia	26630	Upload another image See more images
Bannockburn Rotunda, Memorial Cairn, Flagpole and Statue of King Robert I	Bannockburn, Borestone Brae	8 June 2004	56°05′38″N 3°56′19″W	Robert Matthew Johnson Marshall (Robert Matthew, Eric Stevenson and HF Clark) with statue by Pilkington Jackson	49860	Upload another image See more images
Andrew Melville Hall, University of St Andrews	North Haugh, St Andrews, Fife	18 November 2011	56°20′26″N 2°49′03″W	James Stirling	51846	Upload another image See more images
Craigsbank Parish Church (Church of Scotland)	Craigs Bank, Corstorphine, Edinburgh	13 November 2002	55°56′37″N 3°17′49″W	Rowand Anderson, Kininmonth & Paul (William Kininmonth)	48977	Upload another image See more images
Sacred Heart Roman Catholic Church and Presbytery	Kyle Road, Kildrum, Cumbernauld	23 September 1994	55°57′06″N 3°58′37″W	Gillespie, Kidd & Coia	24091	Upload another image See more images
Mortonhall Crematorium	Howdenhall Road, Edinburgh	15 April 1996	55°54′09″N 3°10′13″W	Spence Glover & Ferguson (A Dewar)	43242	Upload another image
Our Lady of Good Counsel Church, Glasgow	73 Craigpark, Dennistoun, Glasgow	23 September 1994	55°51′45″N 4°13′21″W	Gillespie, Kidd & Coia	33891	Upload another image See more images
Pitcorthie House	Colinsburgh, Fife	28 February 2014	56°13′36″N 2°49′39″W	Trevor Dannatt	52177	Upload Photo
University of Edinburgh, Main Library	George Square	17 January 2006	55°56′34″N 3°11′20″W	Spence, Glover and Ferguson (John Hardie Glover, JM Marshall and Andrew Merrylees)	50191	Upload another image
Brucefield Church	East Main Street, Whitburn, West Lothian	4 December 2008	55°52′01″N 3°40′54″W	Rowand Anderson, Kininmonth and Paul (William Kininmonth and Tom Duncan)	51254	Upload another image See more images
84–87 Princes Street, incorporating the New Club	Princes Street, Edinburgh New Town	28 March 1996	55°57′08″N 3°11′53″W	Alan Reiach, Eric Hall & Partners	43322	Upload another image
Scottish Ambulance Service station and St Andrew's House, St Andrew's Ambulance Association	30 Maitland Street and 54 Milton Street, Cowcaddens, Glasgow	7 February 2005	55°52′04″N 4°15′24″W	Skinner, Bailey & Lubetkin then Bailey and Robb (Douglas Carr Bailey)	50073	Upload another image See more images
Pathfoot Building, University of Stirling	University of Stirling, Stirling	15 May 2009	56°08′57″N 3°55′36″W	Robert Matthew Johnson Marshall (John Richards, Gerrard Bakker and Frank Clark)	51327	Upload another image
Principal's House, University of Stirling	University of Stirling, Stirling	15 May 2009	56°08′57″N 3°54′54″W	Morris and Steedman	51322	Upload Photo
Anniesland Court	833-861 (Odd Nos) Crow Road, Anniesland, Glasgow	2 April 1996	55°53′27″N 4°19′31″W	Jack Holmes and Partners	43034	Upload another image See more images
Royal Commonwealth Pool	Dalkeith Road, Edinburgh	29 March 1996	55°56′21″N 3°10′22″W	Robert Matthew Johnson Marshall (John Richards, Euan Colam and Harold Medd)	43148	Upload another image See more images
Royal Botanic Garden, 1967 Greenhouse	Inverleith, Edinburgh	4 June 2003	55°57′59″N 3°12′29″W	GAH Pearce	49216	Upload another image See more images
Burrell Collection	2060 Pollokshaws Road, Pollok Country Park, Glasgow	23 January 2013	55°49′51″N 4°18′27″W	Barry Gasson Architects (Barry Gasson, Brit Andresen, John Meunier, Jack Wilson and Margaret Maxwell)	52002	Upload another image See more images
Scottish Widows Fund and Life Assurance Society Head Office	Dalkeith Road, Edinburgh	3 March 2006	55°56′25″N 3°10′28″W	Spence, Glover & Ferguson (John Hardie Glover, John Legge, Norman Arthur and Dame Sylvia Crowe)	50213	Upload another image
The Studio (former Bernat Klein Studio)	High Sunderland, Selkirk	B 4 October 1994; A 25 July 2002	55°34′24″N 2°50′10″W	Peter Womersley	19484	Upload another image See more images
Eden Court Theatre	Inverness, Bishop's Road	27 July 2004	57°28′23″N 4°13′51″W	Law & Dunbar-Nasmith (Graham Law)	49959	Upload another image See more images
Centrelink 5 (Former Cummins Engine Company Ltd)	Calderhead Road, Shotts, North Lanarkshire	18 November 2004	55°49′39″N 3°48′51″W	Ahrends, Burton & Koralek	50013	Upload another image See more images
Robert Louis Stevenson Memorial	West Princes Street Gardens, Edinburgh	15 October 2001	55°57′00″N 3°12′08″W	Ian Hamilton Finlay	48255	Upload another image
Cables Wynd House	Cables Wynd, Leith, Edinburgh	30 January 2017	55°58′26″N 3°10′27″W	Alison & Hutchison & Partners (Robert Forbes Hutchison, Walter Scott and Francis W Tinson)	52403	Upload another image See more images
Linksview House	Tolbooth Wynd and Kirkgate, Leith, Edinburgh	30 January 2017	55°58′26″N 3°10′21″W	Alison & Hutchison & Partners (Robert Forbes Hutchison, Walter Scott and Francis W Tinson)	52404	Upload another image See more images

== Former Category A listings ==
Name	Location	Date listed	Geo-coordinates	Notes	LB number	Image	
Clunie Power Station	Loch Faskally	A 5 March 2001; B 11 February 2011	56°43′01″N 3°46′41″W	Harold Ogle Tarbolton	B	47621	Upload Photo

== A-Groups ==
- The University of Glasgow's Joseph Black building forms an A-Group with the Category A listed Graham Kerr building. The Graham Kerr building is a pre-war building, dating from 1923.
- The Sloy Awe power station forms an A-Group with the Category B listed Sloy dam.
- The Ben Cruachan turbine hall forms an A-Group and the Category B listed Cruachan dam which forms the reservoir above Loch Awe.
- The University of Edinburgh's David Hume Tower (Block A) and David Hume Lecture Block (Block B); and their Main Library, George Square, form an A-Group with their Category B listed William Robertson (Block C); Adam Ferguson (Block D) and George Square Theatre (Block E) buildings.
- The University of Stirling's Principals House and Pathfoot Building for an A-Group with the Nuffield Staff Houses (2-3, 4-5 and 6-7) Airthrey Castle Yard. The three buildings are Category B listed.
- The Edinburgh Botanic Garden's 1967 greenhouse forms an A-Group with the Head Gardener's Cottage, Inverleith House, 1858 Palm House and 1834 Palm Stove, Linnaeus Monument, Caledonian Horticultural Society Hall, and the Laboratory and Lecture Hall Buildings at 20a Inverleith Row.
- Robert Louis Stevenson Memorial forms an A-Group with a number of other Category A, Category B and Category C listed public art installations in Princes Street Gardens.

== Bibliography ==
- Campsie, Alison (8 July 2016). "10 of Scotland's most unusual buildings". The Scotsman. Edinburgh.
- "Scotland's 50 post-war A-listed buildings". BBC News. BBC. 4 February 2017.
- "In Pictures: Post-war listed buildings in Edinburgh". BBC News. BBC. 20 May 2011.
