= Geilston =

Village in Argyll and Bute, Scotland

Coordinates: 55.96839°N 4.66270°W

- Location within Argyll and Bute
- OS grid reference: NS3449677495
- Council area: Argyll and Bute
- Lieutenancy area: Argyll and Bute
- Country: Scotland
- Sovereign state: United Kingdom
- Police: Scotland
- Fire: Scottish
- Ambulance: Scottish
- UK Parliament: Argyll, Bute and South Lochaber
- Scottish Parliament: Dumbarton

Geilston is a house and an area on the edge of the village of Cardross in Argyll and Bute, Scotland. It is the site of Geilston Garden, a National Trust for Scotland Property that surrounds it. The House is not open to the public.

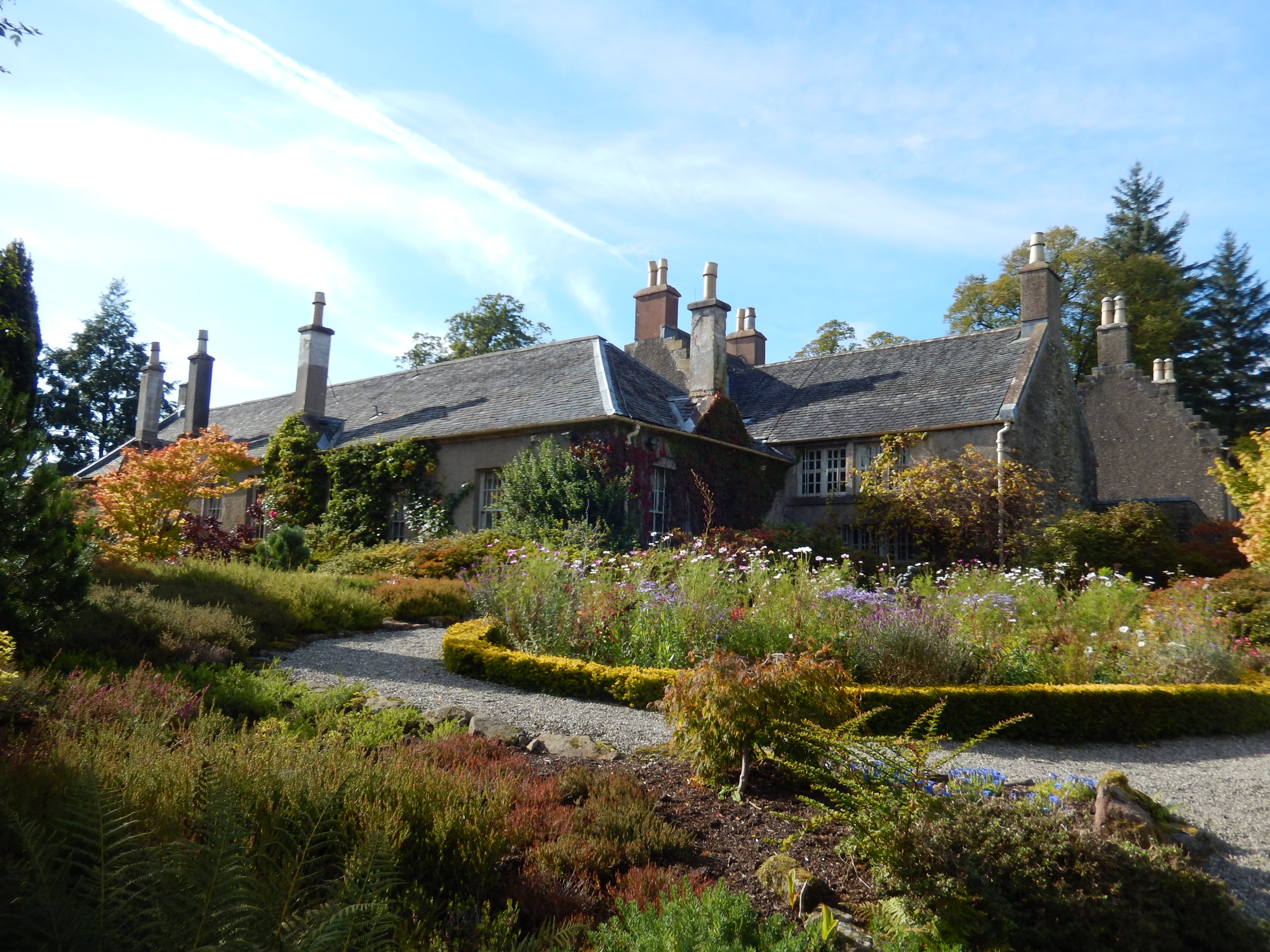
Geilston House

The current house itself dates back to 1766, with the Walled Garden dating back to 1797. However the land of Geilston was the property of the Wood Family in the 16th century. A previous building most likely was on the site as a much eroded datestone has been found with the probable date of 1666.

== See also ==
- Geilston Garden
