= Metzstein =

Metzstein (Yiddish: מצשטיין or מעצשטיין) is a surname. Notable people with the surname include:

- Isi Metzstein (1928–2012), German-born Scottish architect
- Saul Metzstein (born 1970), Scottish film director, son of Isi
