= Cables Wynd House =

Structure in Edinburgh, Scotland

Coordinates: 55°58′26″N 3°10′26″W

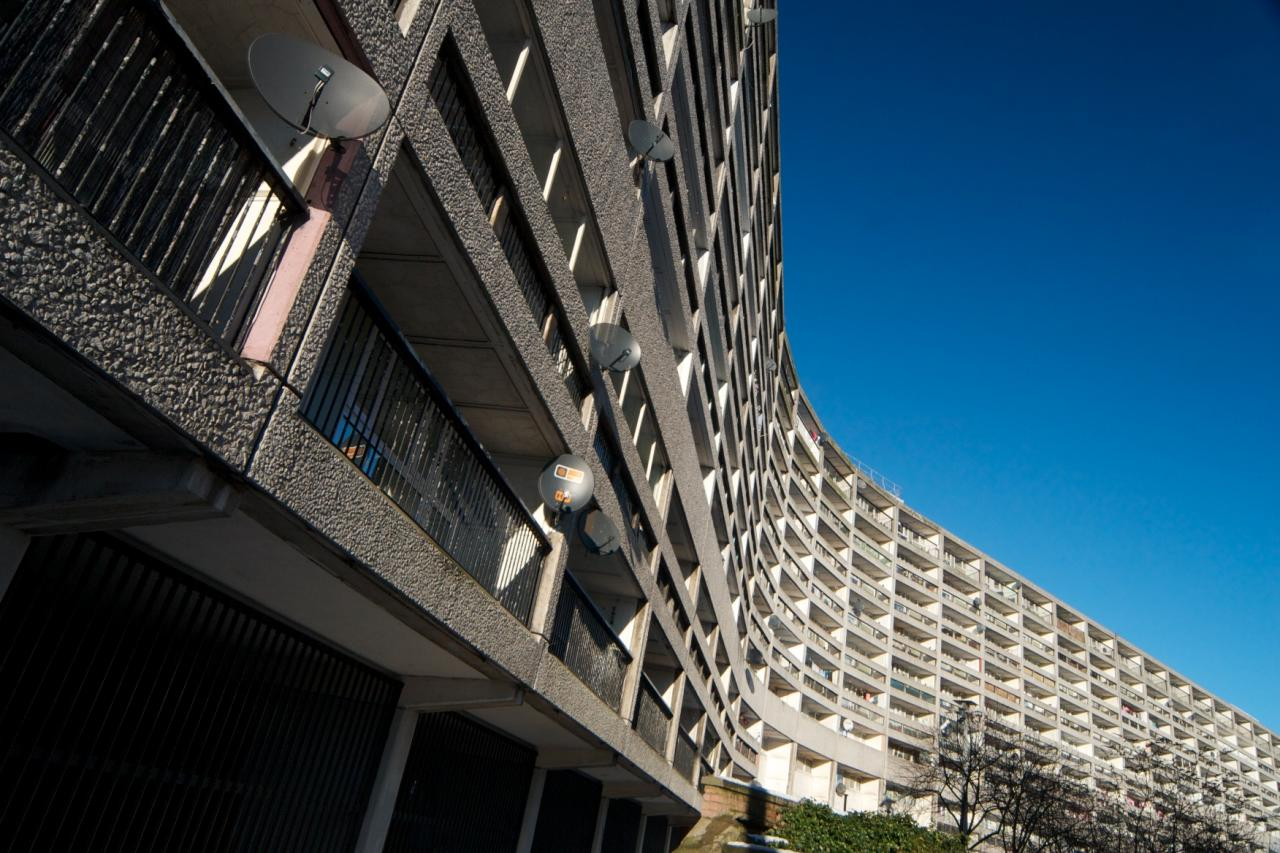
Cables Wynd House

Cables Wynd House, better known as the Leith Banana Flats or the Banana Block because of its curved shape, is a nine-storey local authority housing block in Leith, Edinburgh. The building has ten storeys. The ground floor is called Cables Wynd and the nine floors above constitute Cables Wynd House. This often leads to confusion in postal and other services.

== Design ==
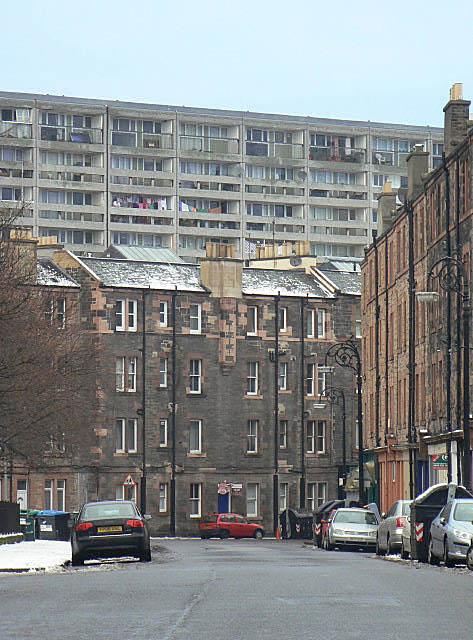
Cables Wynd House with older tenement houses in the foreground

The building was designed by Alison & Hutchinson & Partners under the leadership of Robert Forbes Hutchinson. Under construction between 1962 and 1965, for many families the complex offered a welcome improvement over the overcrowding and slum housing conditions that were still common problems at the time.

The entire building (along with the nearby Linksview House of similar design, though not curved) was awarded an 'A' listing by Historic Environment Scotland from January 2017, being cited as one of the best examples of 'brutalist' architecture in Scotland. This is the highest rating which can be awarded to a building in Scotland.

== Maintenance and occupation ==
Cables Wynd House contains 212 flats and has a 24-hour concierge service situated on the ground floor, and CCTV coverage. Most of the properties use deck access, but the ground floor flats are accessed via individual front doors. Some of these properties are preferentially allocated to older people, but in recent years many young families have been allocated larger flats in the building. All but five of the flats remain in public ownership as of 2015.

There is now extensive security in the building which includes a 24-hour staffed concierge, key fob entry system and security camera system on every walkway and in each of the 4 lifts. The building is well maintained with walkways and lifts cleaned on a daily basis by council employees.

In 2012, communal heating and other energy measures were installed by the City of Edinburgh Council.

On 28 June 2024, The Edinburgh Evening news reported that residents had a meeting with City of Edinburgh Council at Edinburgh City Chambers over the elevators state of disrepair that caused a number of residents to become stuck in them. Councillor Katrina Faccenda tabled a motion to include the renewal of the elevators as part of the retrofit project.

== Incidents ==
On 1 December 2011, Lothian and Borders police were called to an incident involving five residents of Cables Wynd House injured by a dog "thought to be a cross between an American pitbull and Staffordshire terrier". On 13 March 2012, the City of Edinburgh Council announced plans in response to the dog attack incident to help residents identify dangerous dog breeds that had been banned under the dangerous dogs act.

On 6 June 2025, part of the building was damaged by a fire. Police confirmed that nobody was injured in the fire.

In July 2026, armed police officers attended a disturbance at the building in which a man was stabbed and later died. A suspect was arrested.

== Use in fiction ==
In Irvine Welsh's Trainspotting, the flats were the childhood home of the character Simon "Sick Boy" Williamson.

In 2007, the block was used during filming of Wedding Belles, which was also created by Irvine Welsh.

== See also ==
- List of Category A listed buildings in Edinburgh
- List of post-war Category A listed buildings in Scotland
- List of Brutalist structures
