= Kilmahew Castle =

- Cardross, Argyll and Bute, Scotland; NS351786
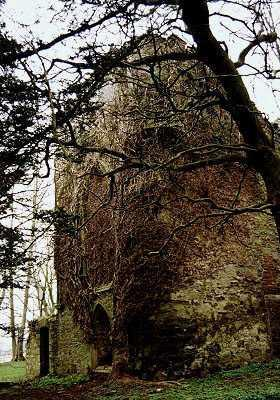
- Kilmahew Castle

Site information
- Type: Rectangular tower house
- Owner: Catholic Church
- Controlled by: Clan Napier until 1820; Various owners 1820 to present
- Open to the public: Yes
- Condition: Ruin

Location
- Coordinates: 55°58′21″N 4°38′34″W

Site history
- Built: Unknown, but after 1290
- Built by: Unknown member of the Clan Napier
- In use: 15th century to 21st century
- Materials: Stone

Kilmahew Castle is a ruined castle located just north of Cardross, in the council area of Argyll and Bute, Scotland. The castle is close by the ruins of St. Peter's Seminary. Also close by is Kilmahew Burn. Kilmahew is named after its patron saint, Mochta (Mahew).

== History ==
Kilmahew castle was built upon the lands granted to the Napiers by Malcolm, the Earl of Lennox around the year 1290. The castle itself was built sometime in the 16th century by the Napier family, who owned it for 18 generations. The Napiers who owned Kilmahew are notable for being the progenitors of members who had notable contributions in the field of engineering, such as Robert Napier, the "Father of Clyde Shipbuilding," and David, James and Montague Napier, who owned the engineering company of Napier & Son.

The estate was inherited by George Maxwell of Newark and Tealing (1678–1744) in 1694, when he assumed the name of his maternal grandfather, John Napier of Kilmahew, but having no legitimate children he was the last of the name, although the Napier of Kilmahew coat of arms survives as a quartering of those of Noble of Ardmore, who therefore now represent the family in heraldry. Following his death the estate was successfully claimed by an illegitimate daughter, Jean Smith, who married David Brydie, and was finally sold to Alexander Sharp in 1820 in repayment of gambling debts. In 1839, the estate was acquired by James Burns of Bloomhill (a neighbouring estate), the son of Rev. Dr. John Burns, eventually dying in the Castle in 1871.

The ruins were acquired by the Archdiocese of Glasgow, along with the surrounding estate, in 1948.

In 2020, Kilmahew Castle was acquired by The Kilmahew Education Trust as part of the 140-acre (57 ha) Kilmahew Estate which also includes St. Peter's Seminary and John Fleming's Walled Gardens.

== Design ==
The castle was originally a four-storey 16th century tower house. Modifications made in 1744 are attributed to the architect John Douglas. Some obvious gothic modifications were done during the 19th century by Alexander Sharp, who owned the castle at the time.
