= Isi Metzstein =

German-born architect (1928–2012)

- Born: Isi Israel Metzstein; 7 July 1928; Berlin, Weimar Germany
- Died: 10 January 2012 (aged 83); Glasgow, Scotland
- Occupation: Architect
- Spouse: Danielle Kahn (m. 1967)
- Children: 3, including Saul
- Practice: Gillespie, Kidd & Coia (with Andy MacMillan)
- Buildings: St Peter's Seminary, Cardross

Isi Israel Metzstein OBE (7 July 1928 – 10 January 2012) was a German-born Scottish architect who worked at Gillespie, Kidd & Coia and taught at the Glasgow School of Art. He became known for his postwar architectural designs working in the European modernist style of Le Corbusier and the American Frank Lloyd Wright.

== Early life ==
Isi Israel Metzstein was born in the Mitte district of Berlin in 1928, one of five children. His parents, Efraim and Rachel Metzstein, were Polish Jews who had moved to Germany in 1920. Isi had an older sister, Lee, an older brother, Josef, a twin sister, Jenny, and a younger brother, Leo, In 1933, Isi's father, Efraim, died leaving his mother to raise the five children on her own.

In November 1938, after Isi's school was set on fire during Kristallnacht, his mother thought that her children would be kept safe by sending Isi and his two youngest siblings to Britain on the Kindertransport. Isi left Berlin alone a few days before his 11th birthday in July 1939. With his brothers and sisters scattered around the UK, Isi was taken in by a family in Hardgate, Clydebank before they could all be reunited once more, eventually settling in Glasgow.

== Career ==
After leaving Hyndland School in 1945, Metzstein's professional career as an architect began with taking evening classes in architecture at the Glasgow School of Art and an apprenticeship under Jack Coia at Gillespie, Kidd & Coia. Whilst at the Glasgow School of Art, Metzstein met Andy MacMillan and the two became friends, often going for drinks together in the Kings Arms on Elmbank Street.

When MacMillan joined the firm in 1954, the pair designed many churches, colleges and schools together in the Modernist style.

In 1969, Metzstein began teaching at the Glasgow School of Art, and became Professor of Architecture at the University of Edinburgh in 1984 before returning to teach in Glasgow in 1991.

== Notable designs ==
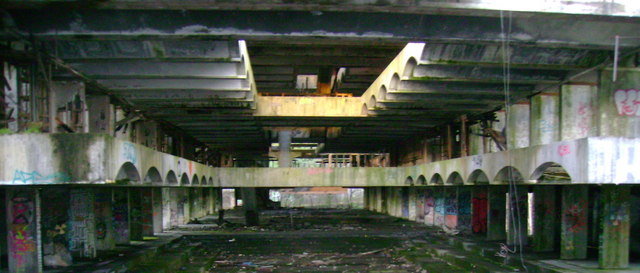
Interior of St. Peter's Seminary, Cardross

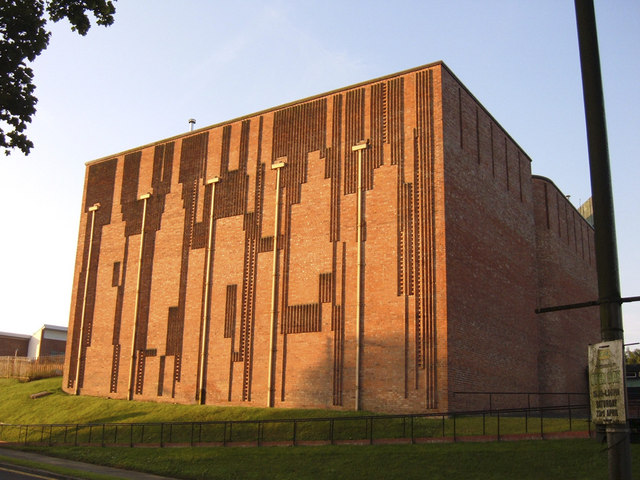
St. Bride's, East Kilbride

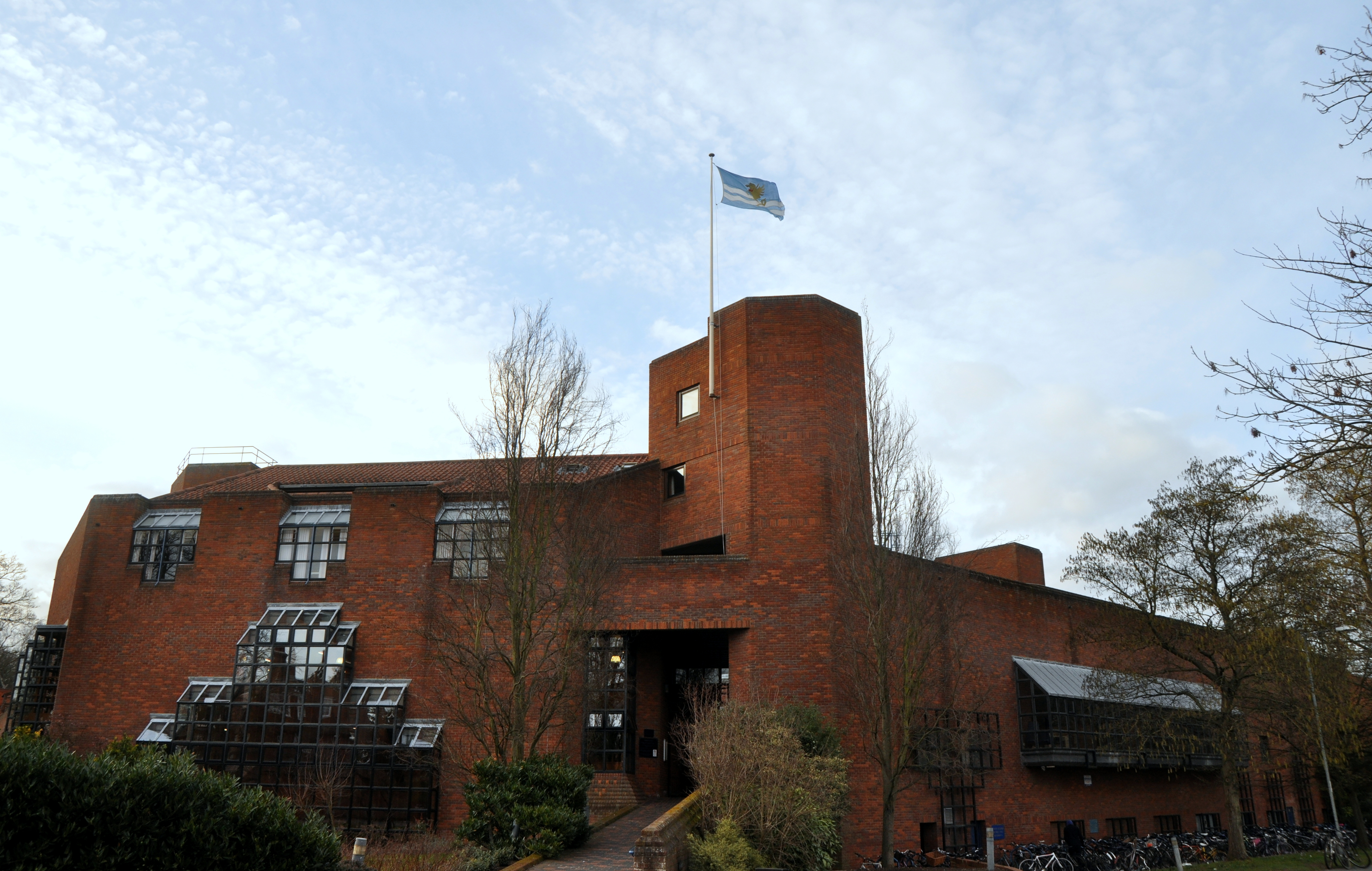
Robinson College Cambridge

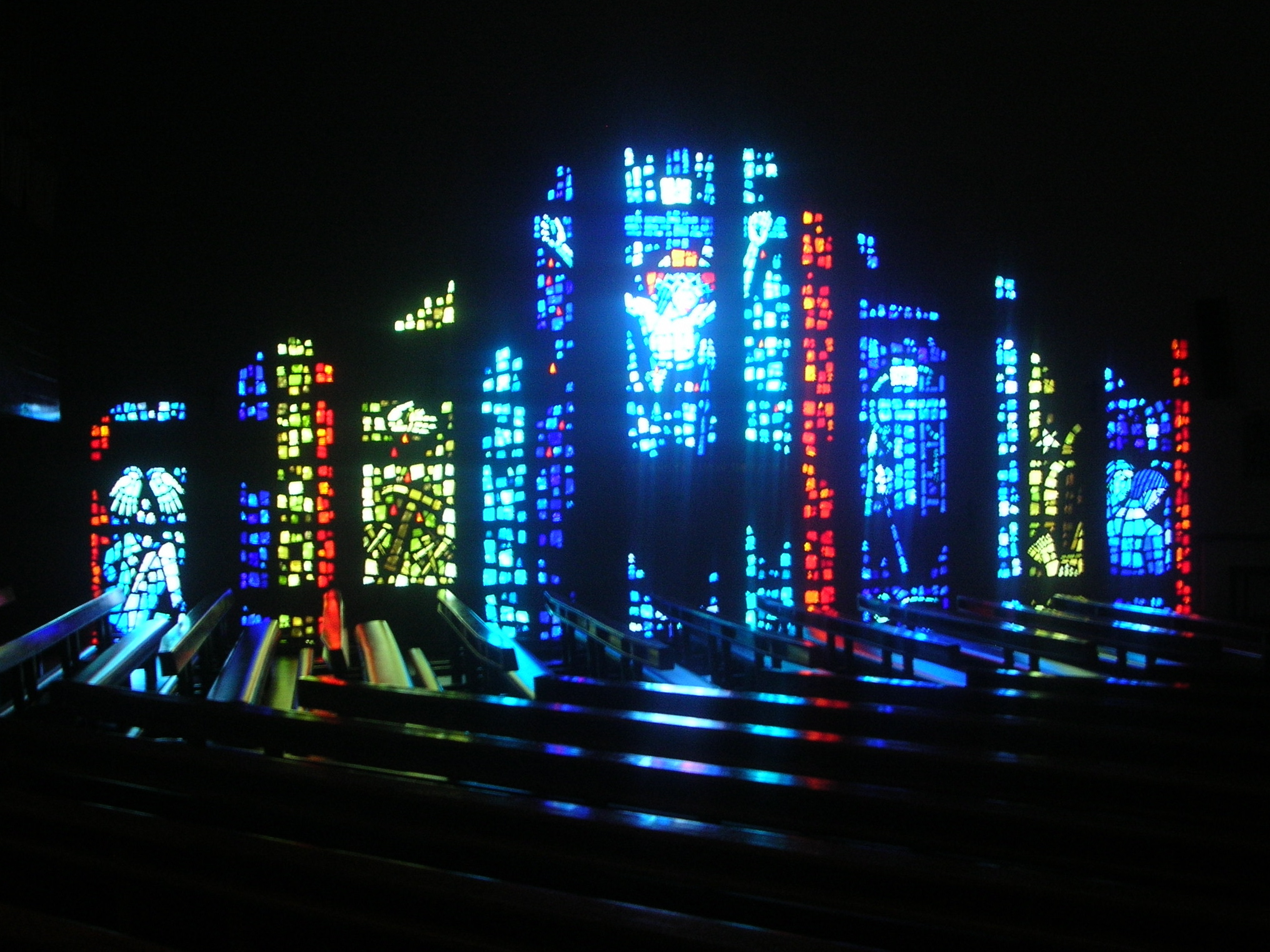
Sacred Heart RC Church, Cumbernauld

- St. Paul's Church, Glenrothes (1957)
- St. Bride's Church, East Kilbride (1962)
- Halls of Residence, University of Hull (1963–1967)
- St. Patrick's Church, Kilsyth (1964)
- Our Lady of Good Counsel, Dennistoun (1965)
- St. Peter's Seminary, Cardross (1966)
- Notre Dame College, Bearsden (1968–69)
- St. Benedict's, Drumchapel (1970)
- St. Margaret's Hospice, Clydebank (1970)
- St. Margaret's RC Church, Clydebank (1970)
- The Library at Wadham College, Oxford (1971–1977)
- Cumbernauld Technical College (1972)
- Robinson College, Cambridge (1974–1980)
- Bonar Hall, Dundee (1975)
- Glasgow School of Art refectory (1981)

== Awards ==
- Royal Scottish Academy Gold Medal (1975)
- RIAS Lifetime Achievement Award 2008 (with MacMillan)
- Honorary RIBA Fellowship
- RIBA Annie Spink Prize for Education 2008 (with MacMillan)

== Personal life ==
Metzstein married Danielle "Dany" Kahn in 1967 and the couple had three children, including Saul.

He died on 10 January 2012 at their home in Dowanhill, Glasgow.

== Legacy ==
Writing of Isi Metzstein's death for Architectural Review, Clare Wright noted that:

"With a change of ethos post war, Coia ceded much of the design control to the young Isi and Andy. An early project for St Paul’s Church in Glenrothes (1957) is a modest building of simple form and materials, yet exhibits an extraordinary quality of light and monumental presence which owed much to Le Corbusier. The sixteen churches that followed formed a distinctive body of work. Combining functional requirements with resonant symbolism, they were the perfect vehicle for developing an architectural philosophy, which reached its most mature expression in the design for St Peter’s Seminary at Cardross."
