= Geilston Garden =

Garden in Argyll and Bute

Coordinates: 55.9691°N 4.6618°W

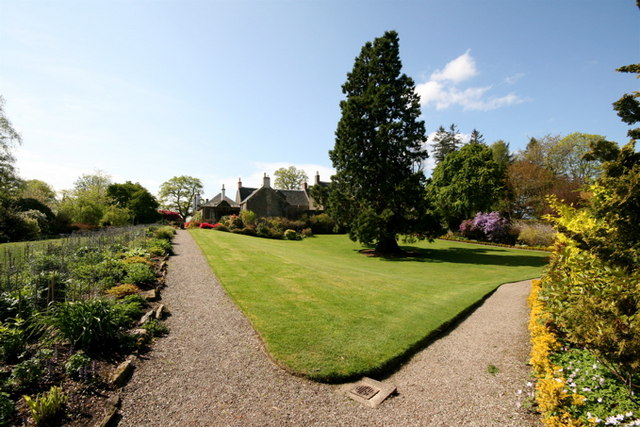
Geilston House

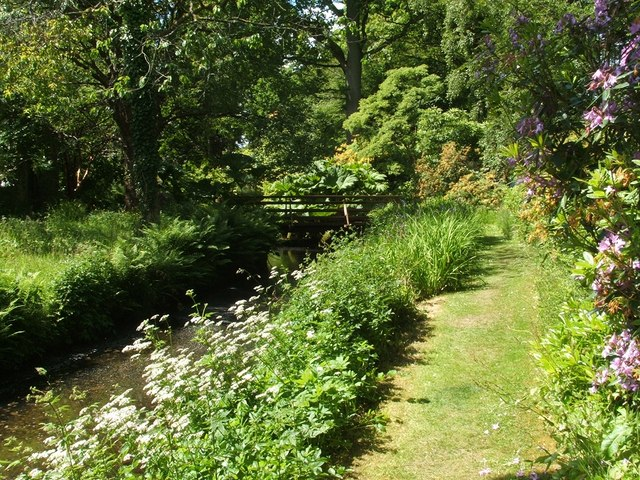
Garden path beside Geilston Burn

Geilston Garden is a property of the National Trust for Scotland, north-west of Cardross, Argyll and Bute.

Geilston Garden was developed more than two hundred years ago with a date given for its development being 1797, combining several features (traditional walled garden, kitchen garden, wooded area). The walled garden has a dominating 100-foot Wellingtonia (Sequoiadendron giganteum) in the centre of the lawn. The Geilston burn wends its way through the north of the estate towards the River Clyde in Cardross. The origins of the garden were most likely a result of the 1770 Montgomery Act, which saw the land around the house enclosed and planting undertaken.

Geilston was opened to the public with the death of the last resident, Margaret Bell, who was a friend of Elizabeth Hendry, the owner of Geilston who bequeathed the house to the National trust for Scotland and gave her friend life rent of the house. The Hendrys moved into Geilston as tenants but the family bought the house from the Geils in 1922. The garden as it appears today was mostly laid out by Elizabeth Hendry and Margaret Bell. A cannon within the garden is said to have been a trophy from the Battle of Corunna brought to the Garden by Major General Geils, a previous owner of Geilston.

The kitchen garden is the most labour-intensive area. It springs to life in April with the first sowings of carrots, parsnips and beetroot closely followed by transplanted brassicas. Visitors can buy in-season produce from a small stand at the garden's entrance.

The walled garden is the focus of spring colour with azaleas, heathers and unusual shrubs such as Cornus kousa 'Satomi'. Summer colour is provided by the spectacularly vigorous species in the long herbaceous border – Thalictrum, Filipendula, Eupatorium, Helenium, Phlox and Sidalcea dominate the display.

The garden is open from April to October daily. The adjacent Geilston House is not open to the public.
