= Orillia Terriers =

Orillia Terriers may refer to:

- Orillia Terriers (2013–), in the Georgian Mid-Ontario Junior C Hockey League
- Orillia Terriers (senior and intermediate hockey), Allan Cup-winning senior hockey team
- Couchiching Terriers, formerly the Orillia Terriers and Travelways, members of the Ontario Junior Hockey League before folding in 2010

== See also ==
- Terrier (disambiguation)
