= Royal Commonwealth Pool =

Sports centre and swimming pool in Edinburgh, Scotland

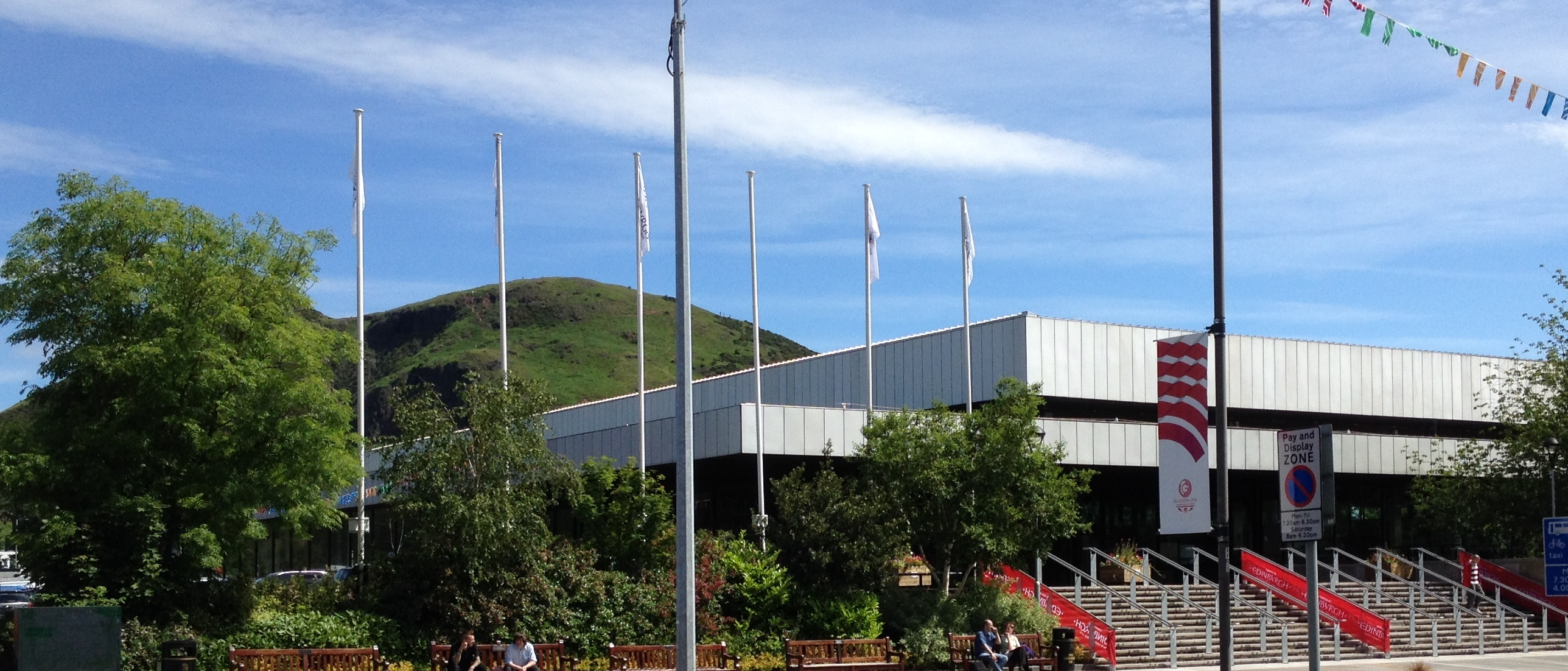
- Royal Commonwealth Pool West side

- Location within Edinburgh city centre Location within Scotland
- Alternative names: Commonwealth Pool, the RCP, or the Commie

General information
- Architectural style: Modernism
- Location: Edinburgh, Scotland
- Coordinates: 55.939202°N 3.172731°W
- Completed: 1970
- Cost: $3.84 million
- Client: Corporation of the City of Edinburgh Architects

Design and construction
- Architect: John Richards of RMJM

Other information
- Seating capacity: 2,000

The Royal Commonwealth Pool is a category-A-listed building in St Leonard's, Edinburgh, Scotland that houses one of Scotland's main swimming pools. It is usually referred to simply as the Commonwealth Pool and known colloquially as the 'Commie'.

== History ==
The pool was commissioned by the Council under a plan by the then Lord Provost, Sir Herbert Archbold Brechin in 1966 as part of a wider project to bring the Commonwealth Games to Edinburgh. This, with the help of other committee members such as Sir John Inch, came to fruition in October 1969.

Construction began in 1967 and was completed in October 1969. The architecture was by Robert Matthew Johnson Marshall with structural input from Ove Arup & Partners. The pool duly hosted the aquatic events at the 1970 British Commonwealth Games.

The pool has been used for elite diving events including the 1986 Commonwealth Games hosted by Edinburgh and the 2014 Commonwealth Games and inaugural 2018 European Championships, both hosted in Glasgow.

The pool was closed 2009 to 2012 for major internal remodelling.

== Architectural award nominations ==
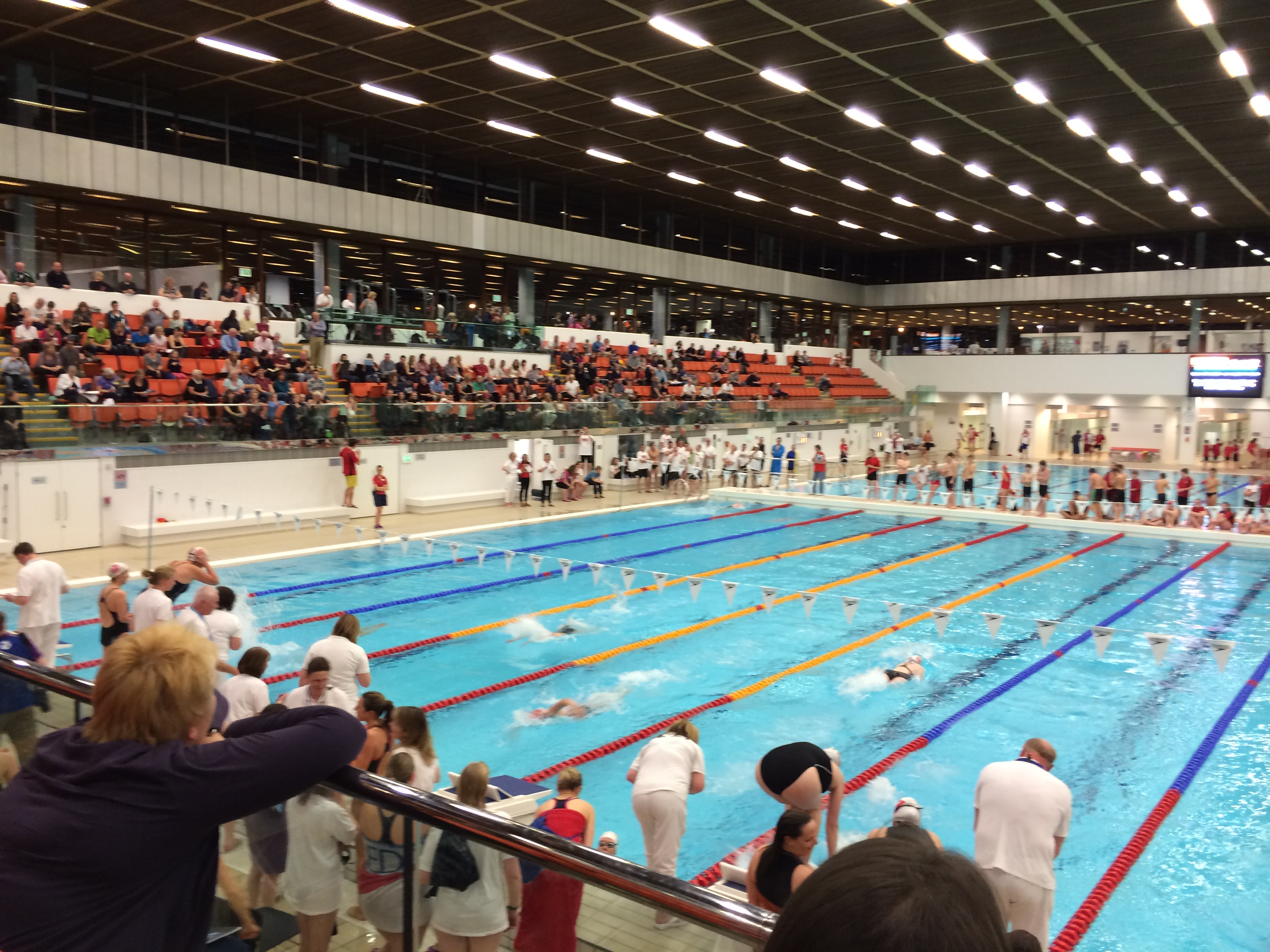
Swimming gala at the Royal Commonwealth Pool in 2013

In 1993 it was selected by the international conservation organisation DoCoMoMo as one of sixty key Scottish monuments of the post-war period.It was also nominated in 2002 by the Architecture Heritage Society of Scotland as one of the most significant modern contributions to Scottish heritage. These sentiments were echoed in Prospect 100 best modern Scottish buildings, published in 2005. S&P Architects were the architects and lead consultants for the 2012 refurbishment and were awarded the Scottish Design Award in 2012 for the best reuse of a listed building.

== Refurbishment ==
In June 2009, the pool was closed to the public to begin refurbishment. The project, led by Frank and Charlie of S&P Architects (now Space&Place Architects) began in August 2009, costing approximately £37 million, and included new 25 metres (82 ft) diving and teaching pools as well as improvements to the changing rooms, café, reception, and the dive gym. It was originally expected to be finished by mid-2011 but did not reopen until March 2012.

== See also ==
- DoCoMoMo Key Scottish Monuments
- List of Commonwealth Games venues
- List of post-war Category A listed buildings in Scotland
- Prospect 100 best modern Scottish buildings
