= St Peter's Seminary, Cardross =

Former Roman Catholic seminary near Cardross, Argyll and Bute, Scotland

St Peter's Seminary Complex
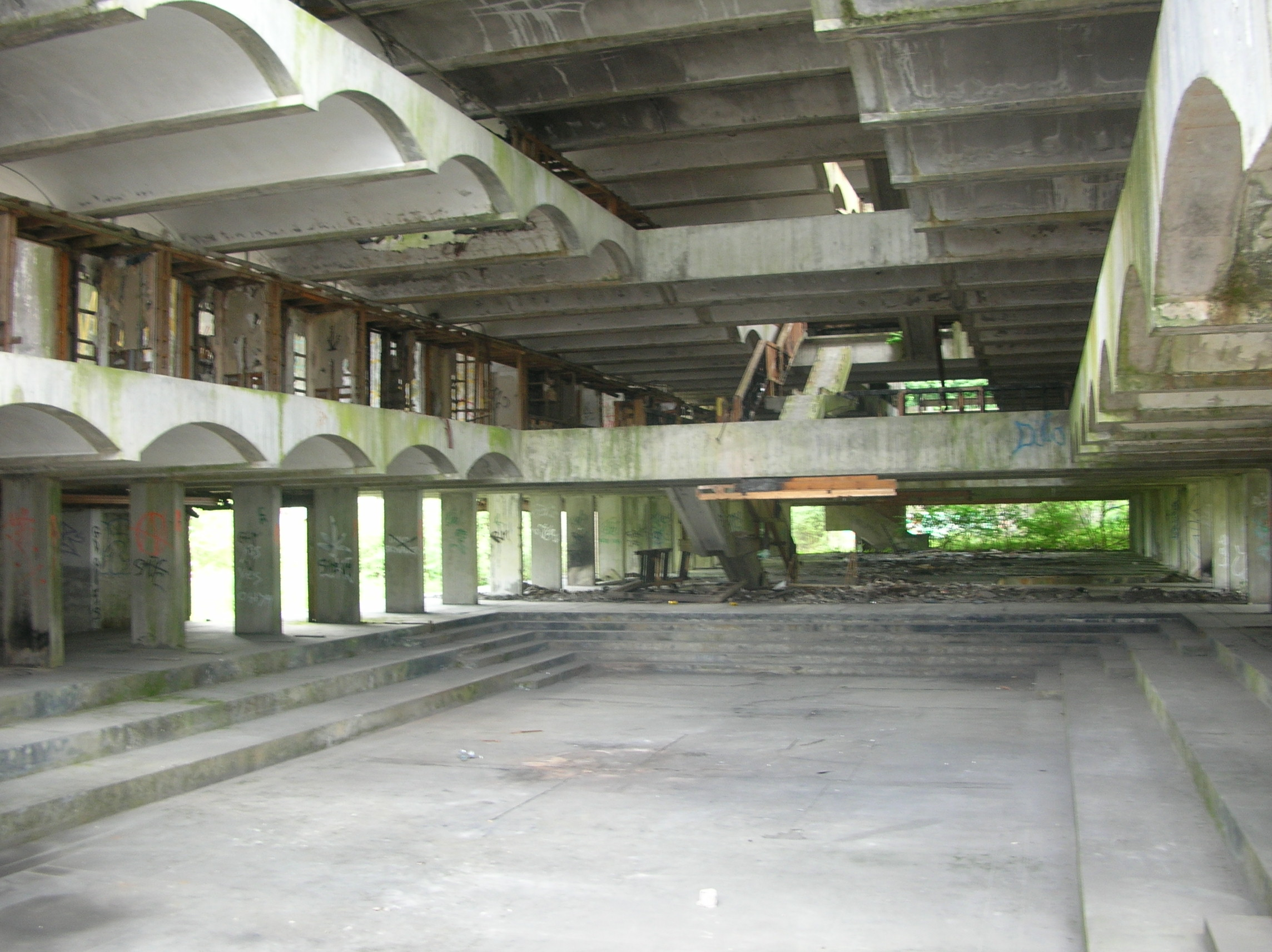
- Main chapel at St Peter's Seminary

- Location of St Peter's Seminary in Scotland
- 55.9703°N 4.6406°W
- Location: near Cardross, Argyll and Bute. GB grid reference NS352784

History
- Built: 1961–1966

Site notes
- Architect(s): Gillespie, Kidd & Coia (Isi Metzstein and Andy MacMillan)
- Architectural styles: Modernist, Brutalist

Listed Building – Category A
- Official name: St Peter's College
- Designated: 6 August 1992
- Reference no.: LB6464

St Peter's Seminary is a former Roman Catholic seminary near Cardross, Argyll and Bute, Scotland. Designed by the firm of Gillespie, Kidd & Coia, it has been described by the international architecture conservation organisation Docomomo International as a modern "building of world significance". It is one of only 42 post-war buildings in Scotland to be listed at Category A, the highest level of protection for a building of "special architectural or historic interest". It has been abandoned since 1987, and is currently in a ruined state. In July 2020, the site was given to the Kilmahew Education Trust Ltd who plan to reinstate the educational elements of the Seminary Complex after conservation and restoration.

== History ==
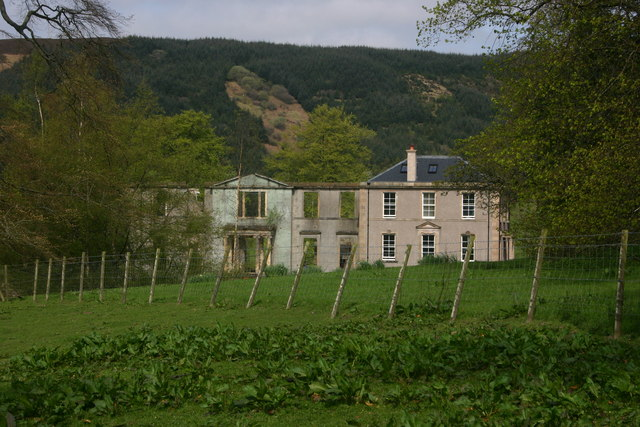
Darleith House in Cardross, the seminary's temporary home before being moved to Kilmahew House

=== Origin ===
Following a fire in 1946 at St Peter's Seminary in the Glasgow suburb of Bearsden, a new home was needed for the seminary. Discussions began with Gillespie, Kidd & Coia in 1953, but the plans for a new college in the village of Cardross were not finalised until 1961, when building began. The college had since moved from Bearsden to temporary homes. The seminary's philosophy students were transferred to Darleith House in Cardross and the theology students to Kilmahew House.

The plan was for a new building to accommodate all the students at Kilmahew House. It was a baronial mansion at the centre of the Kilmahew estate, a Victorian designed ornamental landscape created by the Burns family in the late 1800s. The mansion, built in 1865–1868, was originally a family home for James Burns and his son John, and later the Allan family, from the early 20th Century until just after the war, when the estate was sold to the Roman Catholic Archdiocese of Glasgow. Gillespie, Kidd & Coia employees Isi Metzstein and Andy MacMillan developed a radical design in which the old house would become professorial accommodation, and around it would wrap a striking new main block, a convent block, a sanctuary block and a classroom block. The old house thus became one side of a quadrangle, creating a juxtaposition between old and new buildings.

Also on the land are the ruins of Kilmahew Castle, likely to have been built in the 16th century. When approaching St Peter's Seminary from the west you have to cross an old bridge that spans across the small river, Kilmahew Burn.

=== Architecture ===
Interior of St Peter's Seminary in 1966

Determinedly modernist, brutalist and owing a huge debt to Le Corbusier, the seminary is widely considered to be one of the most important examples of modernist architecture in Scotland. Architecture critic Jonathan Glancey wrote:

The architecture of Le Corbusier translated well into Scotland in the 1960s. Although the climate of the south of France and west of Scotland could hardly be more different, Corbu's roughcast concrete style, could, in the right hands, be seen as a natural successor or complement to traditional Scottish tower houses with their rugged forms and tough materials.

=== History of use ===
By the time it was completed in 1966, the growth of church congregations had stagnated, the number of candidates entering the priesthood had begun to decline, and the Second Vatican Council reforms moved much of their training into the parishes. As a result, the building never reached its full capacity of around 100 students. From the outset, the building was riddled with problems, including maintenance difficulties with such a unique structure and significant water entry; the architects and owners each blamed the other for these problems.

The seminary closed in February 1980. The Archdiocese of Glasgow moved St Peter's College to Newlands in southern Glasgow. St Peter's College, Newlands, remained until November 1984 when it was closed and transferred its students to Chesters College in Bearsden, Glasgow. The Cardross site became a drug rehabilitation centre in 1983. Due to maintenance problems with the modern buildings, they were not used again after 1984, when the centre confined themselves to Kilmahew House, and vandalism began soon after.

=== Abandonment ===
The drug rehabilitation centre closed in 1987. The whole site was abandoned, vandalised on multiple occasions and later surrounded with a higher fence. In 1995, a fire so badly damaged Kilmahew House that it was deemed too unsafe to stand and was demolished. The remaining modern buildings had been Category A listed by Historic Scotland in 1992, and in October 2005 was named Scotland's greatest post-WWII building by the architecture magazine Prospect.

=== Restoration efforts ===
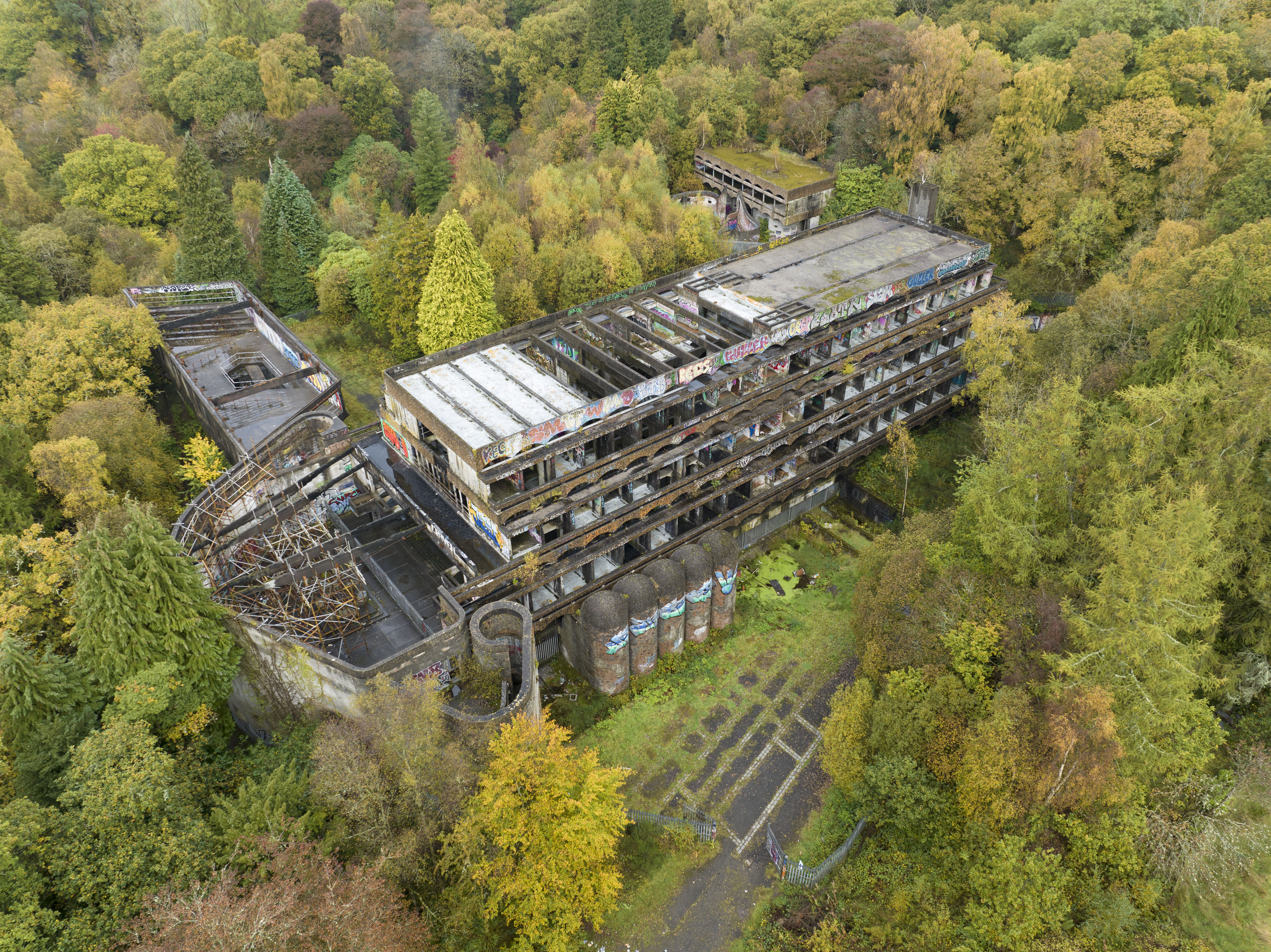
St Peter's Seminary from the air in October 2022

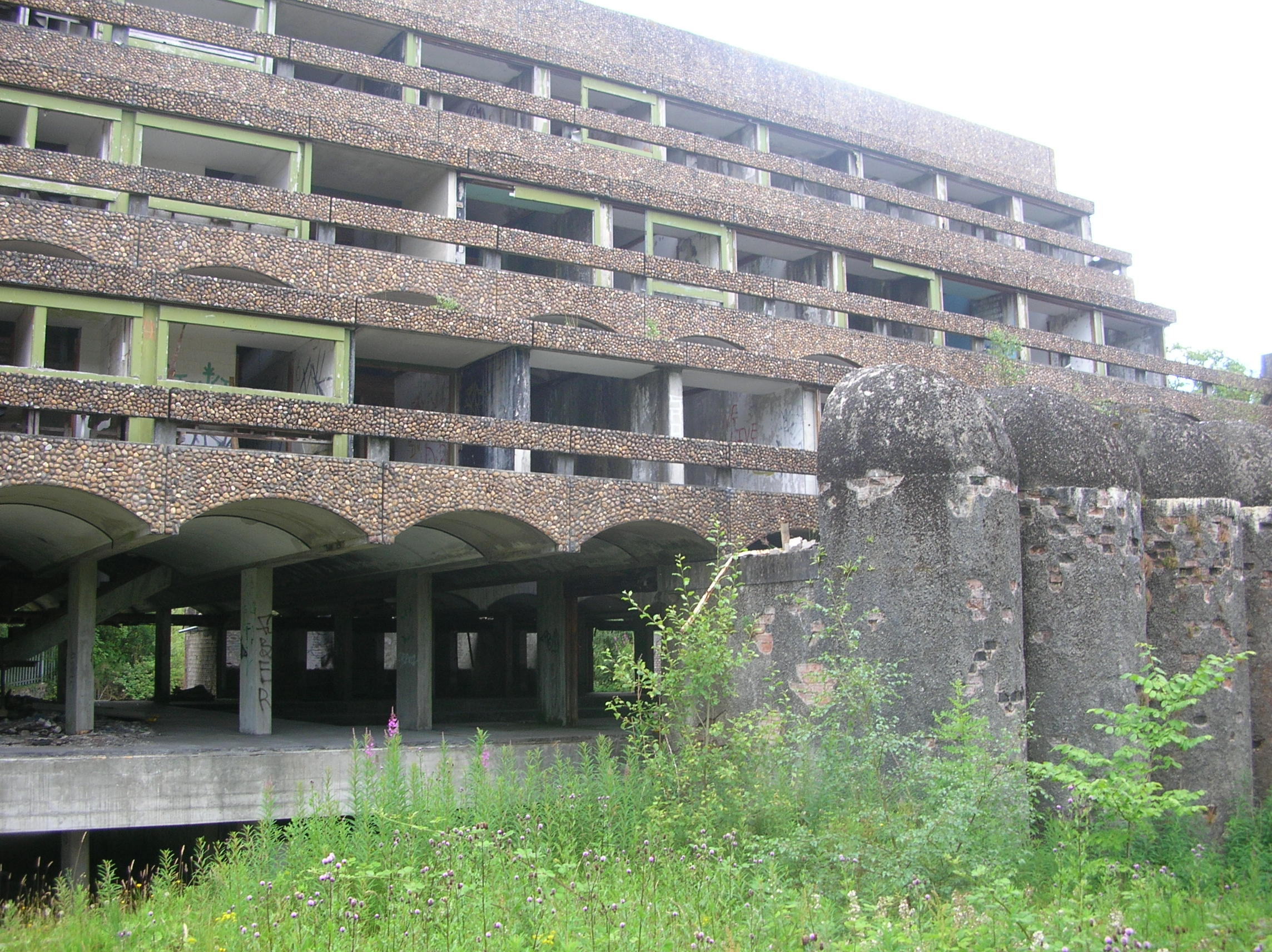
Main block, with terraces of rooms, in July 2005

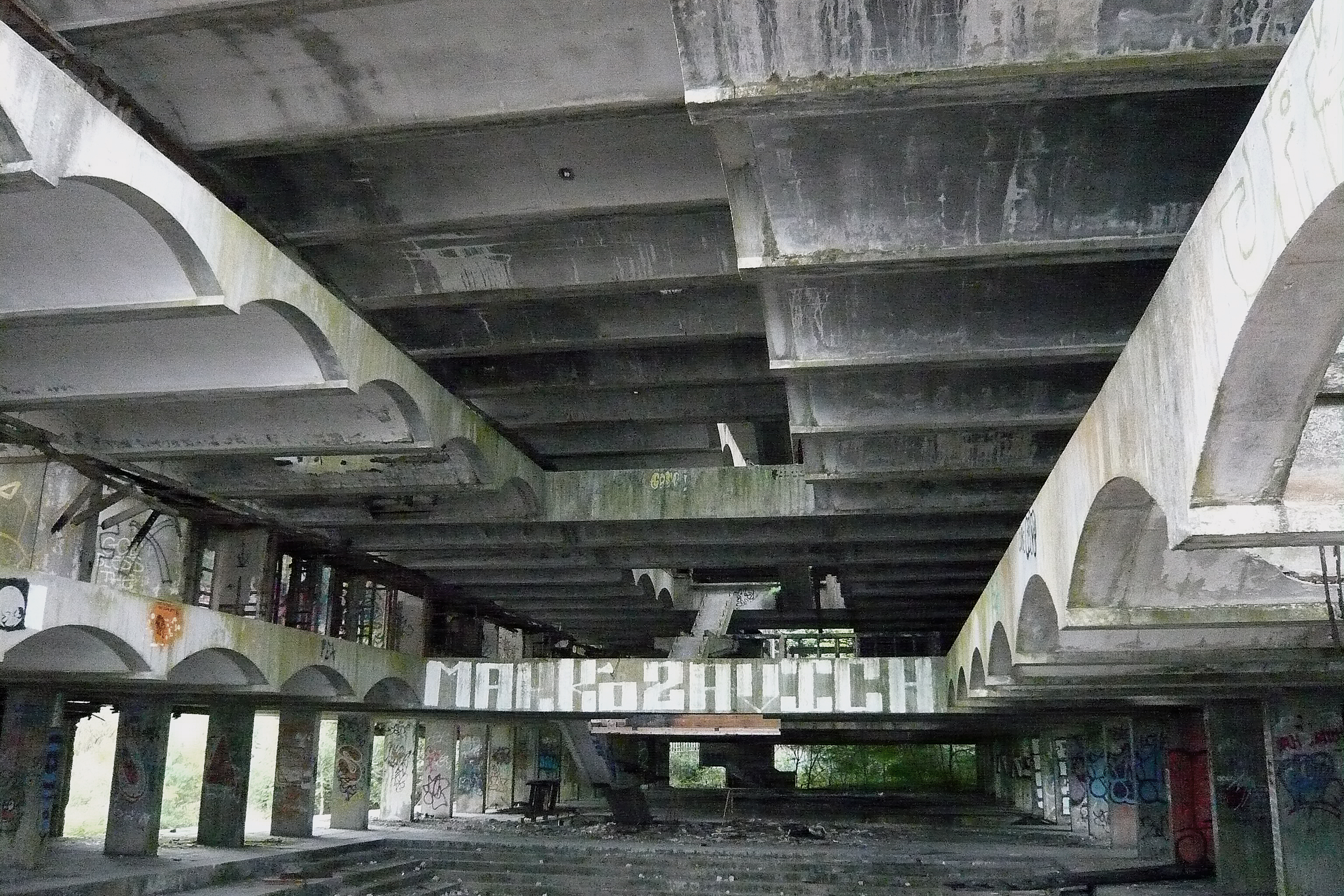
View through the seminary from ground level in June 2010

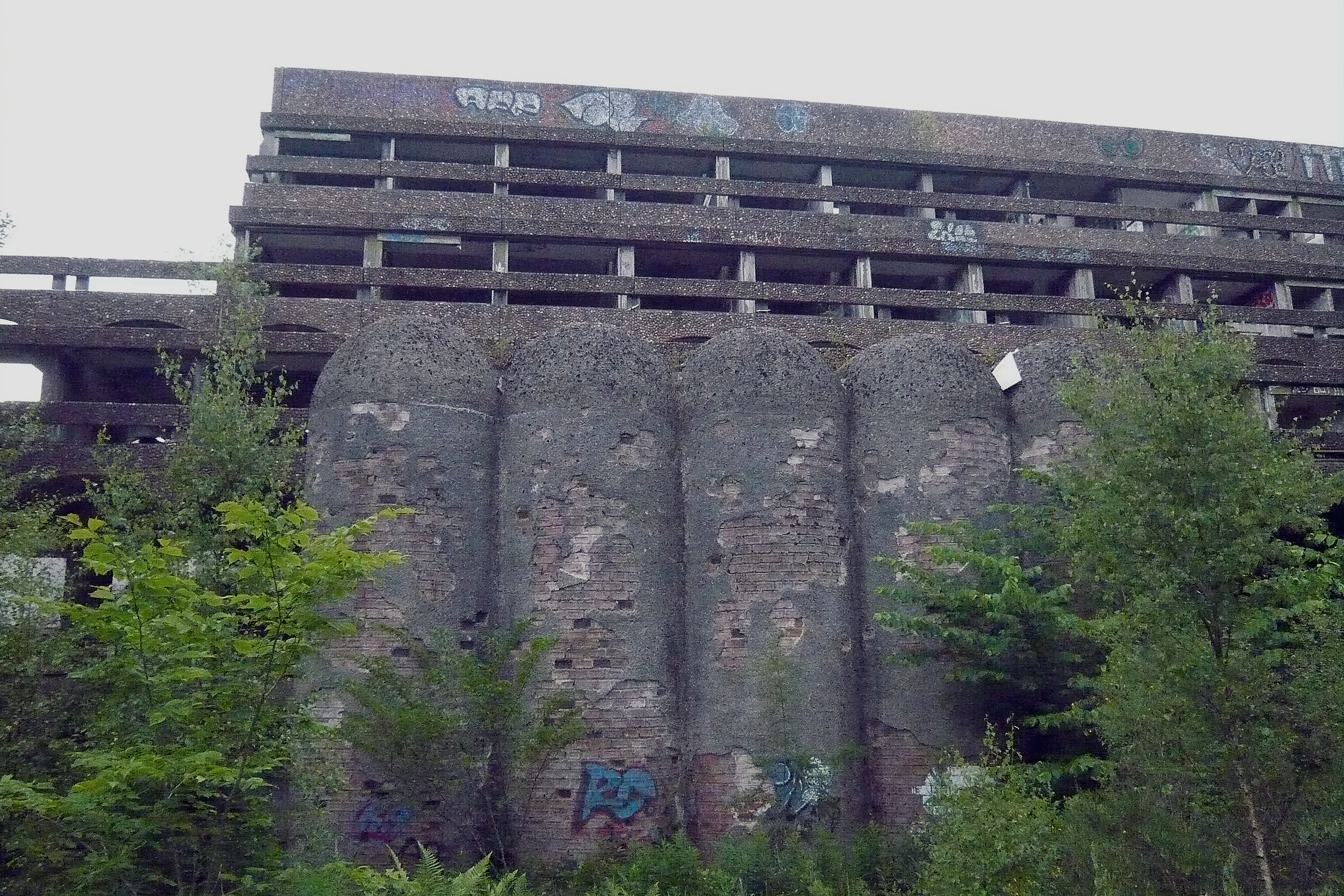
Exterior view of the seminary in June 2010

Nonetheless, the building remains a ruin. Most of the woodwork and glass is now gone, although key aspects of the original design are still clearly visible. According to the architecture writer Frank Arneil Walker, "nothing prepares one for the sight of the new grown prematurely old." Attempts to convert and reuse it, or even protect it from further damage, have come to nothing – hampered by the unique design of the building and its remote location. Plans have included building a 28-unit housing development in the building's grounds, and stabilising the structure by stripping it back to its concrete skeleton, possibly fully restoring a small cross-section. This is a source of concern for conservation bodies including the Twentieth Century Society, who have placed it on their Risky Buildings Register, arguing that this would destroy much of the remaining fabric of the building.

Funded by Historic Scotland and the Archdiocese of Glasgow, Avanti Architects were appointed to undertake a Conservation Assessment of the buildings and landscape. In June 2007, it was announced that the building was to be included in the World Monuments Fund's 100 Most Endangered Sites list for 2008. Also in 2007, developer Urban Splash became involved. Urban Splash worked with architect Gareth Hoskins, and in 2009 environmental arts group NVA were awarded a grant by the Scottish Arts Council to develop temporary and permanent artworks as part of the redevelopment of the building and surrounding woodlands. In 2011, Urban Splash pulled out of the project due to viability issues, and the Archdiocese of Glasgow reiterated its view that no commercial scheme will be viable for the site.

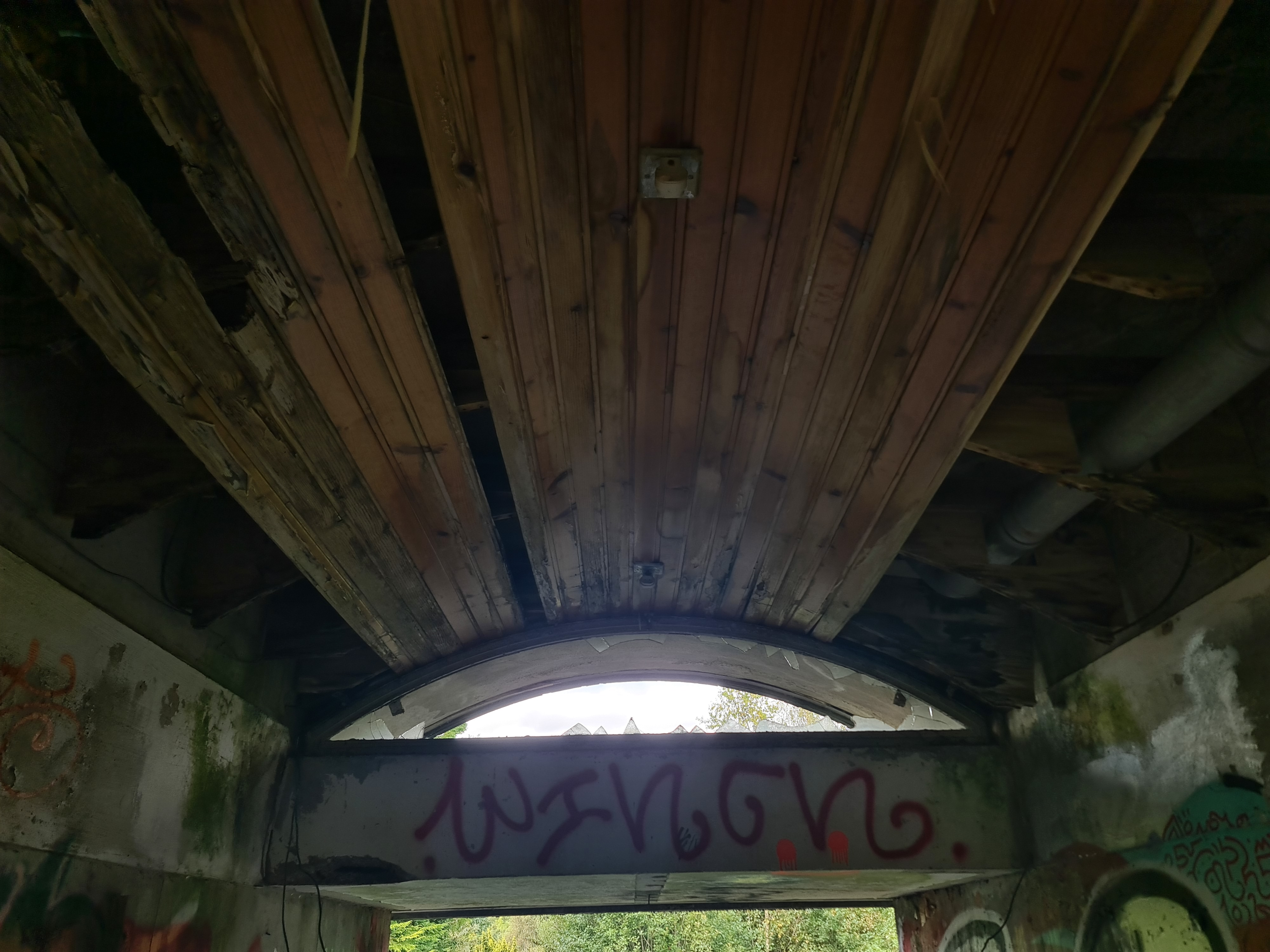
Some of the last surviving wooden fixtures, 2025

NVA, however, continued their involvement with the site, working with local community groups, raising funds and developing plans for the partial restoration of the seminary buildings and interventions in the surrounding landscape. In 2010, NVA presented these plans at the 12th International Architecture Exhibition at the Venice Biennale. In 2012, the Scottish Government gave £500,000 for the building's regeneration by a Historic Scotland building grant. Also in 2012, NVA began working in partnership with the Universities of Glasgow, Edinburgh, and Strathclyde on the 'Invisible College', a research network which aims to radically reinvent the college's original teaching function for the present day. A 'college without walls', the Invisible College has involved organised events bringing together academics, local residents, architects, artists, and other interested parties on site for debate, discussion, and collaborative investigations in the landscape. There have been public talks about ruins, architecture and landscape in the nearby villages of Cardross and Renton, and in The Lighthouse, Glasgow. The college has also produced an 'audio drift', a sound work layering together environmental recordings and interviews, designed to be listened to on portable MP3 players whilst walking through the landscape, and a guided walk around the Kilmahew estate, in collaboration with the Royal Geographical Society. Local residents from Cardross have begun cultivating food in the ruined walled garden of the former estate, which once supplied food for Kilmahew House and later the seminary. Following on from this, in 2013, the Invisible College organised a series of events exploring the horticultural and food-producing aspects of the site. The Invisible College has been funded by the UK Arts and Humanities Research Council (AHRC).

A planning application was submitted in February 2013 by Avanti Architects and ERZ Landscape Architects for the regeneration of the Seminary. Funding was secured from the Heritage Lottery Fund and Creative Scotland. In early 2015, the site was handed over to artist Angus Farquhar, with the intention that part of it would become an arts venue. A major clean-up was completed in 2016 which included the cleaning and de-risking of the buildings, consolidating salvageable vaults and documenting the surviving buildings. NVA presented a sound and light event for the public which was sold out. However, in June 2018, NVA closed down, saying the challenges facing the company were compounded when a core funding bid to Creative Scotland failed.

In 2019, the Roman Catholic Church, owner of the building, said it had been degraded by fire, rain and vandalism and described the building as a "ruin". Ronnie Convery, director of communications of the Archdiocese of Glasgow, said that the building was an "albatross around the neck" of the archdiocese, which had the responsibility to maintain, secure, and insure it, and that they could not sell it, give it away, or demolish it. He added that public funding was the only way forward for the A-listed building. Architecture expert Alan Dunlop said that he "would be happy to tell [the government] how extraordinary it is and how architects from around the world would want to come and see it". The government responded that the future of the building was the responsibility of the archdiocese, but that potential options for its future were under consideration. Many undated images of the ruined building were published illustrating a January 2019 BBC News article.

In July 2020, the site was transferred at no cost to the Kilmahew Education Trust who aimed to "develop a viable vision, with education at its core" for the site.

The building was the subject of the Pleasure Scene Exhibition at Trafalgar Avenue, London, from 11 June to 25 July 2021, with a range of artworks and photography. The building featured in the television series Abandoned Engineering, series 8, episode 8.

== Documentary ==
The 20-minute documentary Space and Light, filmed during the seminary's heyday, depicts the life of seminarians inside the building. Director Murray Grigor was granted access to all aspects of life inside the building, including classes, study, recreation, meals, and worship, but the focus is the building itself.

== Staff ==
Rectors

- Angus MacFarlane, 1878–1880
- William Caven, 1880–1896
- Donald Carmichael, 1896–1902
- John A. Maguire, 1902–1914
- Henry Forbes, 1914–1943
- Charles J. Treanor, 1945–1963
- Michael J. Connolly, 1963–1972
- James McMahon, 1972–1980
- Maurice Ward, 1980–1985

Other notable staff

- Thomas N. Taylor (1873–1963), founder of Carfin Grotto
- David McRoberts (1912–1978), Historian
- Maurice Taylor (1926–2023), Bishop of Galloway
- Joseph Devine (1937–2019), Bishop of Motherwell
- Philip Tartaglia (1951–2021), Archbishop of Glasgow

== See also ==
- Blairs College near Aberdeen, another former seminary
- DoCoMoMo Key Scottish Monuments
- List of Category A listed buildings in West Dunbartonshire
- List of post-war Category A listed buildings in Scotland
- Prospect 100 best modern Scottish buildings

== Bibliography ==
- McVicar, C. and Suau, C. (2008) 'Neglectfulness in the Preservation and Continuity of Late-modern Architecture: the case of St Peter's Seminary by Gillespie, Kidd and Coia', in D. van den Heuvel (ed.) International DOCOMOMO Conference: The Challenge of Change – Dealing with the legacy of the Modern Movement. Amsterdam: IOS Press.
- Rodger, J. (ed) (2007) Gillespie , Kidd and Coia: Architecture 1956–1987. Glasgow: RIAS.
- "Scottish Seminary: St Peter's College, Cardross" (PDF). Concrete Quarterly. 72: 16–23. Spring 1967. Archived from the original (PDF) on 5 July 2011.
- Watters, D.M. (1997) Cardross Seminary : Gillespie, Kidd & Coia and the architecture of postwar Catholicism. Edinburgh: Royal Commission on the Ancient and Historical Monuments of Scotland.
- Wenell, K. (2007) 'St Peter's College and the Desacralisation of Space'. Literature and Theology 21 (3), pp. 259–275.
