= Kilmahew Burn =

River in Scotland

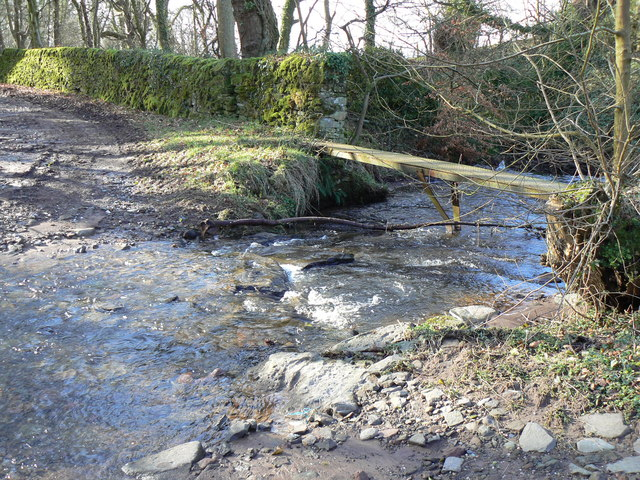
- A small bridge over Kilmahew Burn.

Physical characteristics
- Mouth
  - location: Cardross in Argyll and Bute
  - coordinates: 55.95848°N 4.64991°W

Kilmahew Burn is a small river, burn, that runs from the Kilmahew estate, Cardross, Argyll and Bute into the Firth of Clyde. It flows close by the ruins of Kilmahew Castle and St Peter's Seminary. The bridge over it in Cardross that carries the main road is named Moore's Bridge and was built in 1688.
