= Terrier (disambiguation) =

A terrier is a type of dog. It may also refer to:

== Entertainment ==
- Terrier (novel), by Tamora Pierce
- Terriers, 2010 American television series

== Sports ==
- Boston University Terriers, the athletics teams of Boston University
- St. Francis Terriers, the athletics teams of St. Francis College, Brooklyn Heights, New York
- Wofford Terriers, the athletics team of Wofford College, South Carolina
- Huddersfield Town A.F.C., association football club in England, nicknamed 'The Terriers'
- David Terrier (born 1973), French football defender
- Yorkton Terriers, a junior ice hockey team in Yorkton, Saskatchewan, Canada

== Transportation ==
- Beagle Terrier, a British monoplane
- Terrier armoured digger, engineering vehicle of the British Army
- LB&SCR A1 class, a class of British railway locomotive commonly known as Terriers
- USS Terrier, more than one United States Navy ship

== Other uses ==
- Terrier Search Engine (a.k.a. TERabyte RetrIEveR), a search engine
- Glebe terrier, a Church of England inventory document
- Land terrier, a record of landholdings
- Saint-Loup-Terrier, a commune in the Ardennes department in northern France
- RIM-2 Terrier, a Cold War surface-to-air missile of the US Navy
- Territorial Army (United Kingdom), nicknamed the "Terriers"
- Terriers, a suburb of High Wycombe, a town in England

== See also ==
- Galt Terriers (disambiguation)
- Orillia Terriers (disambiguation)
- Staffordshire Terrier (disambiguation)
