= Galt Terriers =

Galt Terriers may refer to two sports teams from Ontario, Canada:

- Galt Terriers (baseball), a member of the Intercounty Baseball League
- Galt Terriers (ice hockey), a former name of the Cambridge Hornets

== See also ==
- Terrier (disambiguation)
