= NVA (arts organisation) =

Scottish charity for performance art (1992–2018)

NVA was an arts organisation and charity based in Glasgow, Scotland. It was founded in 1992 by Angus Farquhar, a former member of the group Test Dept. The company's name is an acronym of nacionale vitae activa, a Latin term meaning 'the right to influence public affairs'.

The company was best known for its dramatic, large-scale environmental artworks in Scottish natural landscapes, building on the site-specific performances that Farquhar created with Test Dept. These works included The Secret Sign, The Path, The Storr and Half Life. The works were designed to involve local communities and to incorporate regeneration aspects that would benefit the landscapes in the future. For example, improvements were made to the footpaths around The Storr as part of the preparation for that work.

== Selected works ==
=== The Secret Sign ===
The Secret Sign took place at night on 9–16 May 1998 at The Devil's Pulpit, Finnich Glen, near Loch Lomond. Audience members were transported by bus (with the windows blacked out) to the site of the work, where they were given hard hats and wading boots. They were then escorted through the glen by members of the company. Various artistic interventions were visible along the way, including lights, sounds, birds of prey and live performance.

=== The Path ===
The Path was a two-hour night-time walk that took place from 19 May – 4 June 2000 at Glen Lyon in Perthshire. Like The Secret Sign it featured light, sound, performance and music, including Buddhist chant by Ani Choying Drolma.

=== The Storr ===
The Storr took place at night from 1 August – 17 September 2005 at The Storr, a rocky hill in Trotternish on the Isle of Skye. Audience members were bused to the site from bases in Portree and Staffin and kitted out with head torches and walking sticks. They were then led up to the base of the Old Man of Storr, a natural rock formation. Like the earlier works, the walk was marked by lights, sounds, music and performance. The work contained music by Geir Jenssen and Paul Mounsey, live performance by Gaelic singer Ann Martin and recordings of the works of Gaelic poet Sorley MacLean. Other elements of The Storr included a series of LED stars which together made up the largest light sculpture ever seen in the UK. The total cost of mounting the work was £1 million.

=== Half Life ===
Half Life took place at Kilmartin Glen, Argyll from 4–16 September 2007, and was a collaboration between NVA and the National Theatre of Scotland. It consisted of two parts: a daytime element, where visitors could explore a series of sites and installations based around known and rarely seen prehistoric landmarks; and a night-time element, consisting of an outdoor production staged in a forest location at the entrance to the glen, centred on a sculptural set constructed from felled logs.

=== White Bike Plan ===
In April 2010 NVA re-enacted Witte Fietsenplan (White Bike Plan), a free transport programme by the Provos, the Dutch counter culture movement of the 1960s. NVA released 50 white bicycles across the city, which were available for the audience of Glasgow International Festival of Visual Art to travel between venues for the duration of the festival.

=== Glasgow Harvest ===
NVA hosted the first Glasgow Harvest in August 2010 at the Hidden Gardens. Glasgow Harvest was a celebration of urban farming, and encouraged visitors to participate in a mass open-air meal prepared using their home-grown ingredients. Visitors were invited to contribute to an immense jam wall, sample edible punk haircuts, and submit to competition the creative containers they had used to grow plants. Glasgow's allotments made 12 different soups and 20 local schools participated in the Double Rubble Chip Challenge - making chips at Harvest from potatoes they had grown from seed in their playgrounds.

=== Speed of Light ===
Speed of Light was a major Edinburgh International Festival 2012 commission, one of Scotland's signature contributions to the Olympic cultural programme. Conceived and produced by NVA, the transformation of Arthur's Seat, Edinburgh's iconic mountain, combined innovative public art and sport. Using energy-harvesting technologies to illuminate walkers and specially designed battery-powered light suits worn by runners, Speed of Light harnessed collective action to create a multi-layered night-time animation. NVA's Speed of Light also investigated the physical and emotional aspects to endurance running and the extent to which the power of the mind can override physical pain. A series of related blogs, web portraits, events, lectures and co-commissions were presented in partnership with eight of the Edinburgh Festivals.

=== Hinterland ===
Hinterland (2016), NVA's last intervention, was a sound and light show set in the ruined modern building St Peter's Seminary, Cardross.

== Closure ==
NVA announced its closure in June 2018, as a result of funding difficulties associated with its plans to redevelop the St Peter's Seminary site.

== List of works ==
- Stormy Waters (1995)
- Pain (one-man show by Graham Cunnington) (1996)
- Virtual World Orchestra (1997)
- The Secret Sign (1998)
- National Day for Britain, Expo 98 (1998)
- Grand Central (1999)
- The Gimmick (1999)
- The Path (2000)
- The Hidden Gardens (2003)
- The Storr (2005)
- Radiance (2005)
- Half Life (2007)
- Spirit (2008)
- White Bike Plan (2010)
- Glasgow Harvest (2010)
- Speed of Light (2012)
- Hinterland (2016)
