= Staffordshire Terrier =

Staffordshire Terrier may refer to:

- American Staffordshire Terrier, a medium-sized, short-coated American dog breed, part of pit bull group
- Staffordshire Bull Terrier, a medium-sized, short-coated English dog breed, commonly called Stafford, that originated in the Black Country of Staffordshire in the English Midlands.

== See also ==
- Terrier (disambiguation)
