= St Bride's Church, East Kilbride =

St Bride's Roman Catholic Church
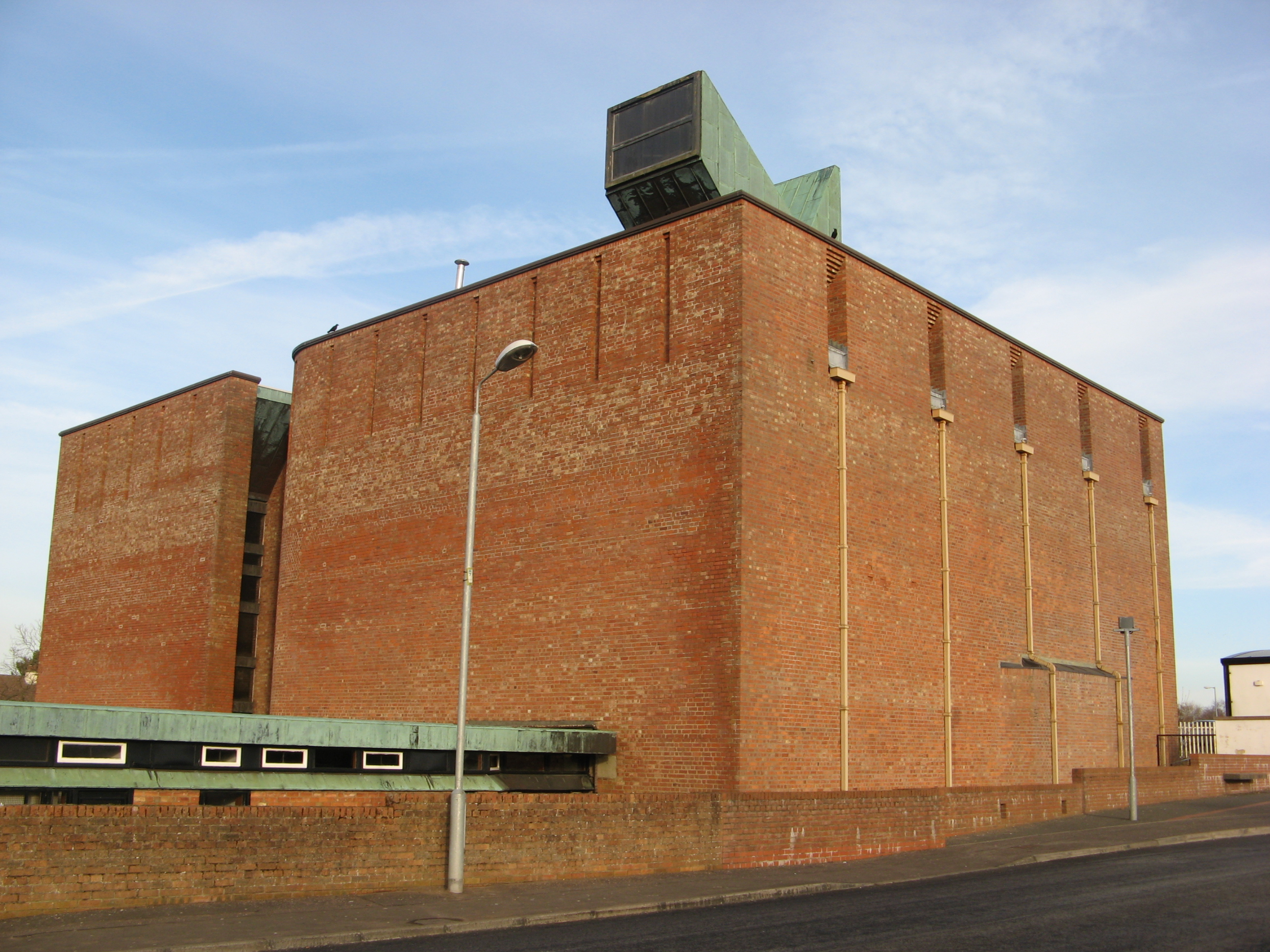

- Location of St Bride's in South Lanarkshire
- 55.7629°N 4.1682°W
- Location: Whitemoss Avenue, East Kilbride
- Country: Scotland
- Denomination: Roman Catholic
- Website: http://www.sbek.org/St_Brides/Welcome.html

History
- Status: Parish Church
- Dedication: Brigid of Kildare

Architecture
- Heritage designation: Category A listed building
- Architect: Gillespie, Kidd and Coia
- Groundbreaking: 1957
- Completed: 1964

Administration
- Province: Glasgow
- Diocese: Motherwell

Clergy
- Priest: Francis G. McGachey

St Bride's Roman Catholic Church is located in East Kilbride in Scotland. It was designed by the architects Gillespie, Kidd and Coia and built between 1959 and 1964.

== Church building ==
Located near the town centre, St Bride's is one of the most recognised buildings in East Kilbride. It was built in the decade after the new town of East Kilbride was begun in 1947 following World War II. The congregation formerly met in St. Bride's Guild Hall in The Village district of East Kilbride. "Kilbride" itself means "Church of Bride" in Scottish Gaelic (the translation has been modernised), and the medieval church or monastery in what became the village before the Reformation were possibly named for St. Bride of Ireland.

The building of St Bride's Church is regarded as one of the finest examples of British twentieth-century ecclesiastical architecture. The church has many unusual features within its architectural structure from the "light cannons" which illuminate the sanctuary, to its externally imposing brick mass. The church is a Category A listed building.

In 2016 restoration work was carried out.

== Services ==
Mass Times

Sunday Masses: 9.30am; 11.30am; Vigil on Saturday 4.30pm. On Holy days of obligation: Vigil Mass is 7pm; Morning Mass 10am. Weekday Masses from Monday to Saturday at 10am.

Confession

On Saturday after 10am Mass and on request.

== See also ==
- DoCoMoMo Key Scottish Monuments
- List of Category A listed buildings in South Lanarkshire
- List of listed buildings in East Kilbride, South Lanarkshire
- List of post-war Category A listed buildings in Scotland
- Prospect 100 best modern Scottish buildings
