= Gillespie, Kidd & Coia =

1927–1987 Scottish architectural firm

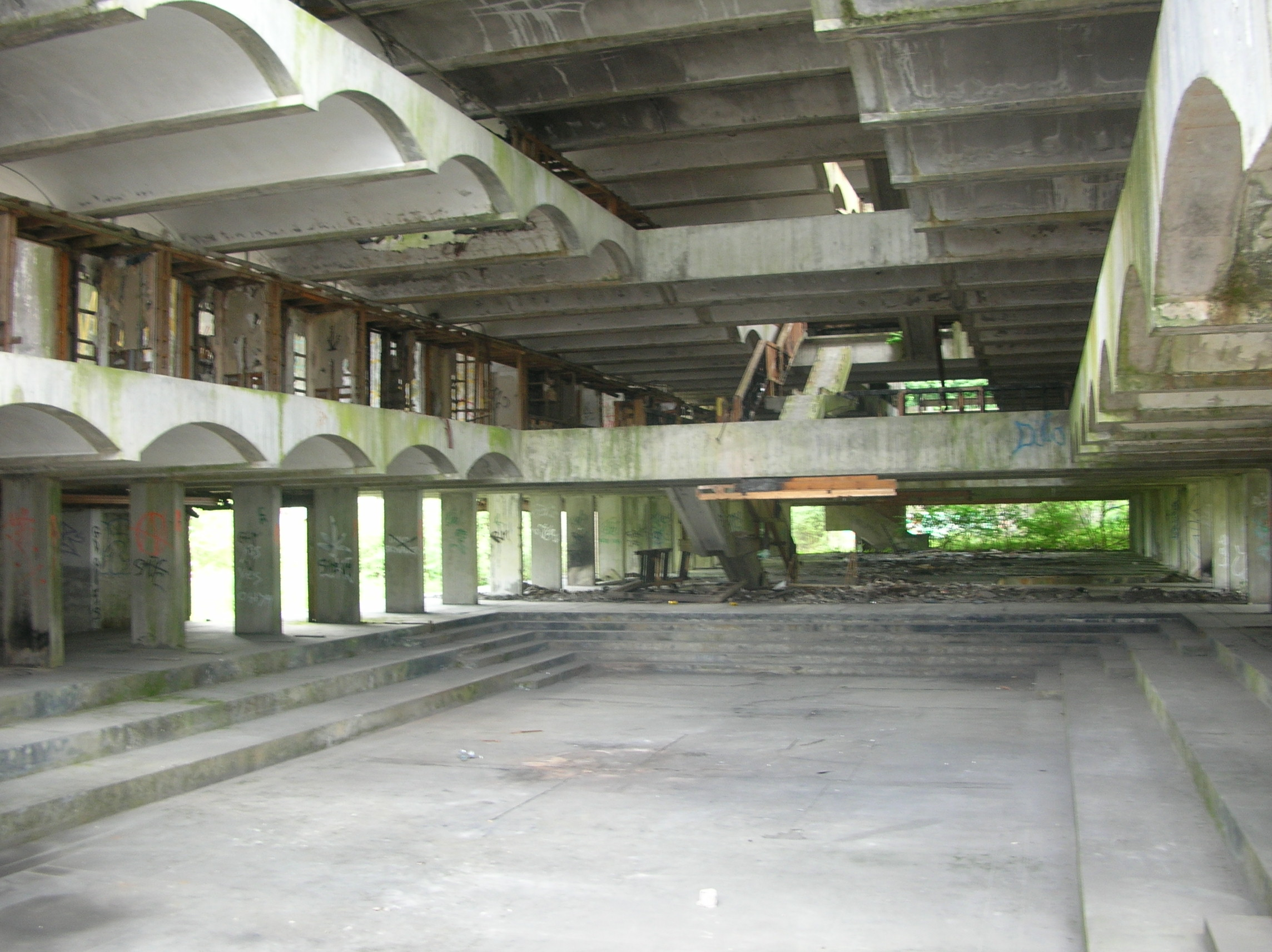
- Main chapel at St Peter's Seminary

Practice information
- Key architects: Jack Coia; Thomas Warnett Kennedy; Isi Metzstein; Andy MacMillan
- Founded: 1927
- Dissolved: 1987
- Location: Glasgow

Significant works and honors
- Buildings: St Peter's Seminary; Wadham College, Oxford; Robinson College, Cambridge; St Bride's, East Kilbride
- Awards: RIBA Royal Gold Medal

Gillespie, Kidd & Coia was a Scottish architectural firm famous for their application of modernism in churches and universities, as well as at St Peter's Seminary in Cardross. Though founded in 1927, they are best known for their work in the post-war period. The firm was wound up in 1987.

In 2007, the firm was the subject of a major retrospective exhibition at The Lighthouse, Glasgow.

== History of the practice ==
=== Origins ===
The Scottish architect James Salmon (1805–1888) established a practice in Glasgow in 1830. John Gaff Gillespie (1870–1926) was hired in 1891, when the practice was known as James Salmon & Son, and was run by the son, William Forrest Salmon. The practice name was changed in 1903 to Salmon & Son & Gillespie, with James Salmon (1873–1924), grandson of the founder, and John Gaff Gillespie as partners. William Alexander Kidd (1879–1928) joined the firm in 1898, becoming a partner, with Gillespie, in 1918 (James Salmon had left the firm in 1913). Kidd became sole partner on Gillespie's death in 1926.

In 1915, the 16-year-old Giacomo Antonio ("Jack") Coia (1898–1981) joined the firm of Gillespie & Kidd as an apprentice. Coia was born in Wolverhampton, England, to Italian parents, and was raised in Glasgow. In 1923, he left for travel to Europe and work in London, returning as a partner in 1927, at Kidd’s request following Gillespie’s death. Kidd himself died in 1928 and Coia thus inherited the practice by then known as Gillespie, Kidd & Coia.

=== Early years ===
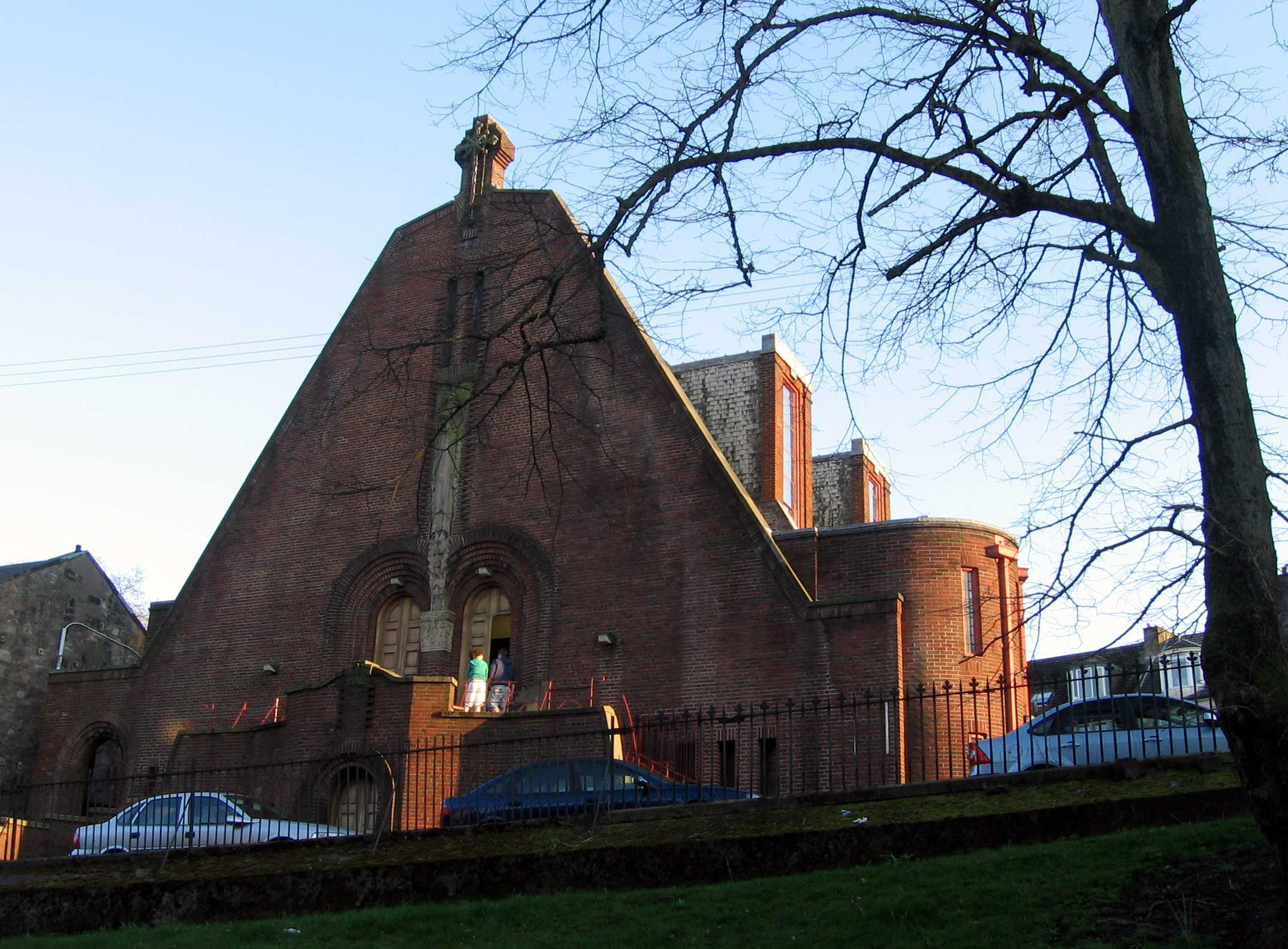
St. Patrick's church, Orangefield in Greenock, built 1934-1935.

At the time Coia took over, the practice had little work. Coia took a teaching position at the Mackintosh School of Architecture within the Glasgow School of Art (GSA), and began to seek new clients. After approaching Donald Mackintosh, the Archbishop of Glasgow, he secured the practice's first commission for a new church in 1931. The Roman Catholic Church would remain the firm's principal client until the early 1970s. In 1938, Thomas Warnett Kennedy became a partner with Coia, contributing to designs for St Peter in Chains, Ardrossan, and the Roman Catholic pavilion for the Glasgow Empire Exhibition. The practice also collaborated with Thomas S. Tait on the Exhibition masterplan.

Even though the Second World War brought a hiatus in the practice's work, one church that they designed, St Columba's Church in Glasgow, was completed in 1941. The Dictionary of Scottish Architects states that Coia was interned as an enemy alien during the war. However, Rodger disputes this, stating that there is no record of the Wolverhampton-born Coia's internment, although several of his Italian-born relatives were taken to the Isle of Man.

=== Post-war period ===
Gillespie, Kidd & Coia was revived in 1945, although without Kennedy, who later emigrated to Canada. Coia hired 17-year-old Isi Metzstein as an apprentice and continued to design churches and other works for the Roman Catholic Church. The firm's work of this period is considered by architectural historians to be inferior. Rodger describes Coia's difficulty with seeing projects through, which was countered by his "flair for heading an architectural office". This led to the development of an atelier-style practice, with Coia gradually handing over design control to concentrate on client relations. In 1954 Andy MacMillan, a contemporary of Metzstein at the GSA, joined the firm from the East Kilbride Development Corporation, and despite neither of the young architects being fully qualified, they had assumed creative control by 1956. Coia's last significant architectural work was for St Charles, North Kelvinside in 1959.

=== MacMillan and Metzstein ===
The first result of the new designers was St Paul's, Glenrothes (1956), which broke with the practice's earlier church designs by embracing the Modernism of Le Corbusier and Frank Lloyd Wright. Their opportunity lay in demographic changes taking place in Scotland at the time. The huge post-war construction project of new towns relocated many people from inner city Glasgow. These changes required new churches for the new town communities, as well as new city churches to service the remaining congregations. Gillespie, Kidd & Coia were one of the few practices involved in the building of the new churches. MacMillan and Metzstein's work in the period 1956–1987 was enabled not only by MacMillan's practical experience at the new town of East Kilbride, but also by the willingness of their principal client, the Roman Catholic Church, to accept radical experimentation in the wake of the Second Vatican Council.

Meanwhile, Coia continued to keep up the profile of the practice through lecturing and through his roles as a prominent member of the Catenian Association of Catholic professionals, as a governor of the GSA, and as president of the Glasgow Institute of Architects. He was made a CBE in 1967, and received the RIBA Royal Gold Medal in 1969.

The church-building programme drew to a close in the 1970s, and Gillespie, Kidd & Coia began to seek out alternative sources of work. They completed several schools, as well as university projects in England. After Coia's death in 1981, the practice was gradually wound down. Their limited output through the 1980s was brought to a close with the conversion of the Museum of Modern Art in Oxford in 1987.

== Architectural work ==
Gillespie, Kidd & Coia's work can be split into three main phases, coinciding with the historical development of the practice. Early works were executed in a neo-romanesque style, with features such as round arches inserted into building shapes influenced by Arts and Crafts architecture and international-style modernism. Their use of brick walls was also bold in Scotland, where stone or render were the dominant external building finishes. This style was continued in the second phase, after the war, but with less successful results. The third and most celebrated phase is the period 1956-1987, when Metzstein and MacMillan took over creative control, bringing with them the influence of Le Corbusier and Frank Lloyd Wright. Concrete, as well as brick, became a preferred material, and the practice continued to be influenced by contemporary developments of Mid-Century modernism and brutalism. The firm is regarded as one of the key British architects of the Roman Catholic Liturgical Movement in the UK that resulted in a large number of new modernist RC churches being built, and other churches being reordered. This group of architects, which included Gerard Goalen, Francis Pollen, Desmond Williams and Austin Winkley, utilised contemporary design and construction methods to deliver the ‘noble simplicity’ instructed by Vatican I.

=== Churches ===
The firm was already designing churches with a modern influence in the 1930s. with St. Patrick's, Orangefield, Greenock forming an example from 1934-35.

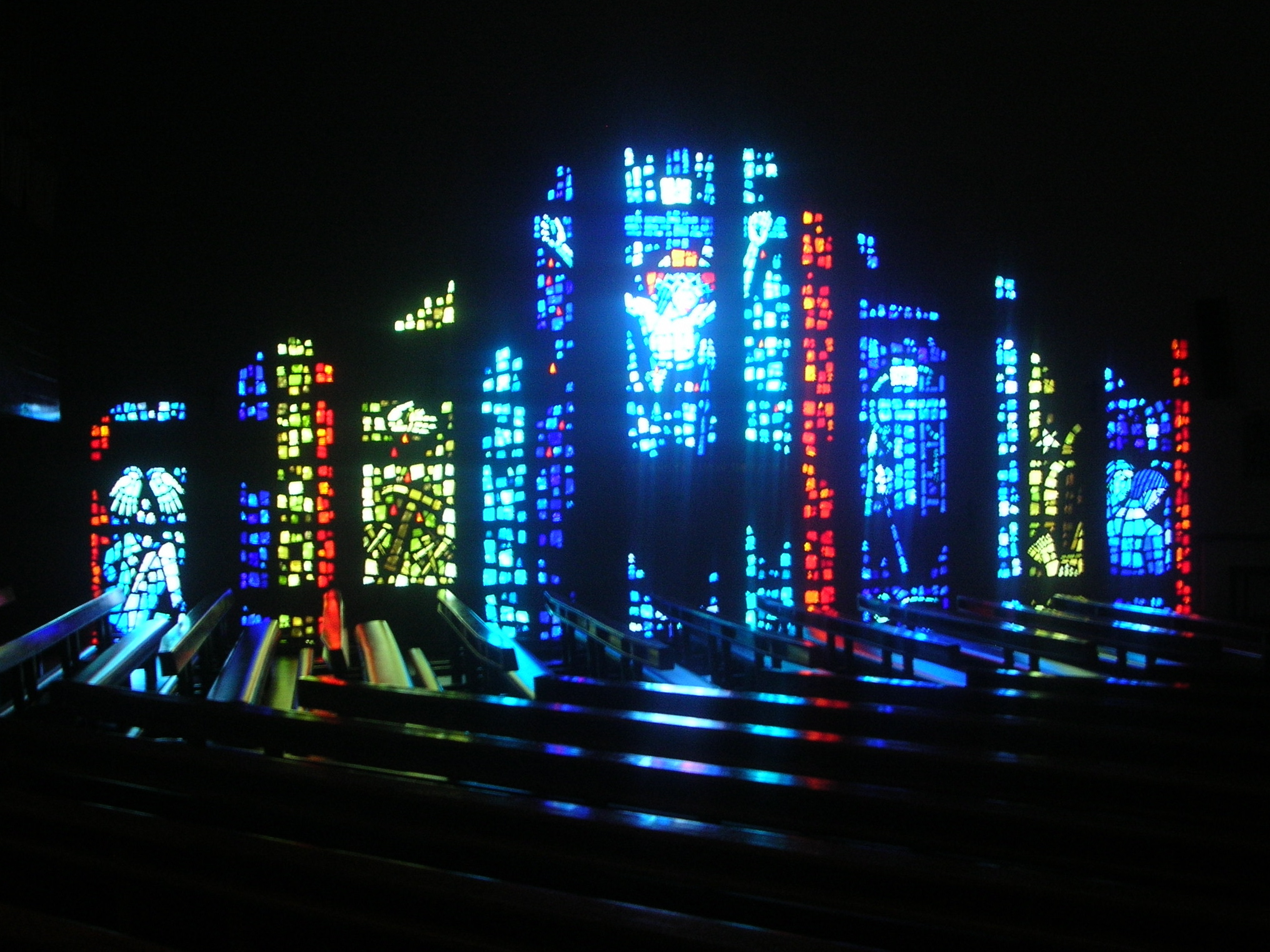
Sacred Heart Church, Cumbernauld

Scotland is peppered with modernist ecclesiastical architecture, virtually all from the firm of Gillespie, Kidd & Coia. St Mary's, Bo'ness (1962), since demolished; St Joseph's, Faifley, (1964); Our Lady of Good Counsel, Dennistoun, (1965); St Benedict's, Easterhouse, (1965); and St. Paul's, Glenrothes, (1956) were all geometric buildings with sweeping roofs, using new construction techniques, such as glued laminated timber. By contrast, churches including St Charles, North Kelvinside, (1959); St Mary of the Angels, Falkirk, (1960); St Bride's, East Kilbride, (1963), St Patricks, Kilsyth, (1963); and Sacred Heart, Cumbernauld, (1964) were all rectangular, load-bearing brick, or in the case of St Charles', exposed concrete frame with brick curtain-walling. These churches are very plain on the outside, but dramatically lit on the inside.

=== St Peter's Seminary ===
St. Peter's Seminary in Cardross, Argyll and Bute is regarded as Gillespie, Kidd & Coia's most significant work. However, since the building's closure in the 1980s it has been in a ruinous state. In January 2019 Ronnie Convery, director of communications of the Archdiocese of Glasgow, said that the building was an "albatross around the neck" of the archdiocese, which had the responsibility to maintain, secure, and insure it, and that they could not sell it, give it away, or demolish it.

=== Schools and colleges ===
Gillespie, Kidd & Coia carried out several school commissions, including Roman Catholic schools in Cumbernauld, Bellshill and Glasgow, and the Notre Dame College in Bearsden (1969, partially demolished 2007).

=== Offices and other works ===
The firm's most prominent office commission was the BOAC building on Buchanan Street, Glasgow (1970). The firm undertook relatively little residential work, with projects in East Kilbride, Cumbernauld (1961), and Stantonbury, Milton Keynes (1976), as well as sheltered housing in Dumbarton (1967). In 1962, the practice completed Bellshill Maternity Hospital (demolished 2003), winning a Civic Trust Award.

=== University architecture ===
From the late 1960s, Gillespie, Kidd & Coia executed three major university projects in England, as well as Bonar Hall at the University of Dundee (1976). The first was The Lawns, a group of student residences in Cottingham, Yorkshire for the University of Hull. It was awarded a RIBA Bronze Regional Award in 1968 and was listed Grade II 1993. From 1971 to 1979 they worked on two extensions to Wadham College, Oxford. These included one large block containing new undergraduate accommodation and a college library, and a smaller addition behind the King's Arms pub. This includes a small music shop for Blackwell's, described as "a refreshing, shocking contribution to the gloomy Oxford backstreet in which it stands" by the Architects' Journal.

Robinson College, Cambridge was their most important building of this phase, and the last major building they designed. Winning a competition in 1974 for the entirely new college, their building is clad almost exclusively in brick, and incorporates existing gardens dating from the 1890s and 1900s. It was listed at Grade II* in 2022.

== Bibliography ==
- Diane Watters, Cardross Seminary : Gillespie, Kidd & Coia and the architecture of postwar Catholicism, (Edinburgh: Royal Commission on the Ancient and Historical Monuments of Scotland, 1997).
- Robert Proctor, "Churches for a Changing Liturgy: Gillespie, Kidd & Coia and the Second Vatican Council", in Architectural History, no. 48 (2005), pp. 291–322.
- Johnny Rodger (ed.), Gillespie, Kidd & Coia: Architecture 1956–1987 (Glasgow: Lighthouse, 2007), ISBN 978-1-873190-58-6.
