= Cardross =

Village in Argyll and Bute, Scotland

Coordinates: 55°57′45″N 4°39′10″W

Cardross: Scottish Gaelic: Càrdainn Ros
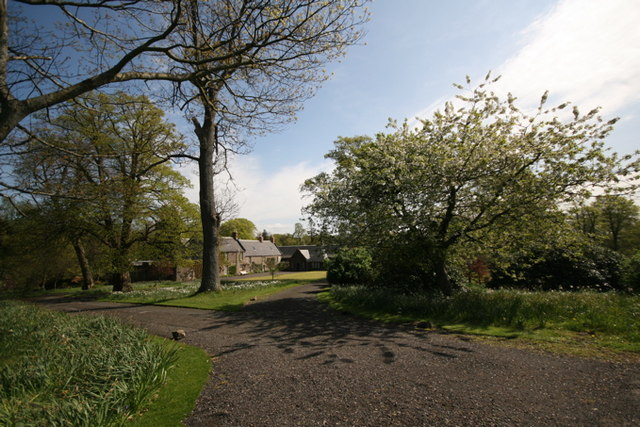
- Geilston House, by Cardross, owned by the National Trust for Scotland

- Location within Argyll and Bute
- Population: 2,070 (2020)
- OS grid reference: NS344775
  - Edinburgh: 57 mi (92 km)
  - London: 359 mi (578 km)
- Council area: Argyll and Bute
- Lieutenancy area: Dunbartonshire
- Country: Scotland
- Sovereign state: United Kingdom
- Post town: DUMBARTON
- Postcode district: G82
- Dialling code: 01389
- Police: Scotland
- Fire: Scottish
- Ambulance: Scottish
- UK Parliament: Argyll, Bute and South Lochaber
- Scottish Parliament: Dumbarton

Cardross (Scottish Gaelic: Càrdainn Ros) is a large village with a population of 2,032 (2022) in Scotland, on the north side of the Firth of Clyde, situated halfway between Dumbarton and Helensburgh. Cardross is in the historic geographical county of Dunbartonshire but the modern political local authority of Argyll and Bute.

Cardross Village took its name from the historic parish in which it is located and where King Robert the Bruce lived the final years of his life. The Parish of Cardross stretched in area from the River Leven on the west side of Dumbarton to Camus Eskan (near Helensburgh), and stretched as far north to include the village of Renton in the Vale of Leven.

The distinction between Cardross village and Cardross Parish is particularly important for students of Scottish history. King Robert the Bruce's documented association with ’Cardross’ occurred three centuries prior to the existence of the modern-day village, and at a time when the name referred to the ecclesiastical parish and its church, Cardross Kirk.

The original piece of land known as ’Cardross’ is at the eastern edge of the historic parish and the western point of the confluence of the River Clyde and River Leven at the town of Dumbarton, facing across to Dumbarton Rock and Castle. Today the land is known as “sand point” and sits on the edge of Dumbarton's Levengrove Park. The site of medieval Cardross Kirk, and its remains, sits within Levengrove Park.

== Etymology ==
Cardross is a name of Brittonic origin. The first part of the name is the Brittonic or Pictish *carden, generally meaning "a wild place, a thicket" (Middle Welsh cardden). The second is the element -rōs, "moor, promontory" (Welsh rhos). In other words, a thicketed promontory of land.

== History ==
During the era when Cardross was part of the Common Brittonic-speaking Hen Ogledd and ruled over by the Kingdom of Strathclyde, the Catholic Church founded a monastery by at least the 6th-century upon the present site of St Mahew's Roman Catholic Church.

Following his victory in the Scottish Wars of Independence, King Robert the Bruce purchased the portions of lands of Pillanflatt lying on the western bank of the River Leven, Dunbartonshire, in the Parish of Cardross from the Earl of Lennox in 1326. In 1329, the Bruce died at the manorial house that he built there.

A field on the bank of River Leven south of the village of Renton, West Dunbartonshire, called the Mains of Cardross, is thought to have been the location of his royal manor, although nothing remains today.

The present settlement of Cardross developed after the Church of Scotland relocated the parish kirk in 1653, 3 miles (5 km) west from its pre-Reformation site on the western bank of the River Leven to what was then the fledgling ferry community on the northern bank of the River Clyde. The new settlement eventually took its name from the church, and the parish that it served, as the 17th-century worshippers headed for the re-located ‘Cardross’ every Sunday. The pre-1653 graveyard is still in use and contains several 17th-century gravestones.

Modern-day ‘Ferry Road’ runs the short distance between the A814 and the River Clyde at the easternmost extremity of Cardross Village (closest to Dumbarton).

In 2017, Dumbarton Football Club's proposed new stadium was refused planning permission, with one of the objections being its likely placement on the medieval Bruce site.

== Natural history ==
Two kilometres (1 1/4 miles) northwest of Cardross is a peninsula called Ardmore Point. This privately owned area of land has a nature trail and is considered a Regionally Important Geological Site (RIGS) due to unique rock formations including an exposed sea cliff. It is a popular fishing and bird-spotting area inhabited by grey seals.

== Facilities ==
=== Commercial ===
There are a number of businesses, including a sawmill, car mechanic, a Co-operative Food Store, newsagents, pharmacy, post office, plumber's merchant, an Indian style take-away, a couple of hairdressers, soap shop and a jewellers.

Ardardan Estate is a working farm with a farm shop, plant nursery and tea room and is situated outside Cardross near Ardmore Point, but closer to the town of Helensburgh.

=== Sports ===
The town possesses a golf course, bowling, tennis and football clubs. Paul Lawrie won the Scottish Professional Golf Championship which was held at Cardross Golf Course in 1992.

=== Education ===
Cardross has its own pre-school and primary school.

=== Transport ===
Cardross railway station has direct links to both Glasgow Queen Street and Edinburgh Waverley stations on the North Clyde Line; the station is operated by ScotRail.

A bus service is provided by First Glasgow.

=== Tourist attractions ===
Cardross is the site of one of the most important modernist buildings in the world. St Peters seminary. Built in the early 1960s. It currently lies in a state of extreme disrepair.

Geilston Garden, a National Trust for Scotland property, is located on the north west edge of the village.

There is also a ruined church, which was bombed in May 1942 during World War 2. The reason for Cardross being targeted by German bombers remains unclear, locals have speculated buildings in the village might have been mistaken as a shipyard or an oil storage facility.

=== Religion ===
The village has two places of worship: Cardross Parish Church (Church of Scotland) and a Roman Catholic Church dedicated to Saint Mahew. The original parish church was bombed during the Second World War and its ruins are located next to the former Church of Scotland manse.

== Listed buildings/structures ==
There are nearly fifty listed buildings/structures in Cardross, two of which are category A.

Some structures of note:

- The 1467 ruins of St. Mahew's Chapel, which stand on the site of a 6th-century Celtic Church monastery, are equally important as the location of a Mass stone (Scottish Gaelic: Clachan Ìobairt) during the post-Reformation history of the Catholic Church in Scotland. Before St Patrick's Church was formally organized in 1830, the growing population of Irish and Highland Scots Catholics living in Dumbarton would meet at the chapel ruins for prayers and Masses offered by a visiting priest from Greenock. For this and other reasons, ownership of the chapel ruins were acquired by the Archdiocese of Glasgow, who restored them in 1955 into a Catholic church which remains in use.
- The former St. Peter's Seminary, designed by Gillespie, Kidd & Coia, is situated to the north of the village; it is closed to the public. Abandoned in the late 1980s, it is in a state of dilapidation, particularly internally. In early 2015 the site was handed over to the NVA with the intention that part of it will become an arts venue, however those plans failed due to a lack of funding.
- The ruined 15th-century Kilmahew Castle that was built by the Napier Clan is situated just north of the village.
- The main road through the village goes over Moore's Bridge (1688) which carries the road over Kilmahew Burn.

== Notable residents ==
- Robert the Bruce, King Of Scots, national hero who led Scotland victoriously during the First War of Scottish Independence. Purchased the manor of Cardross in 1325 and made it his primary residence until his death in 1329.
- A. J. Cronin, the celebrated doctor and writer, was born in Cardross in 1896.
- The BBC sports presenter Hazel Irvine lived in Cardross during her youth.
