= List of listed buildings in Edinburgh/7 =

This is a list of listed buildings in Edinburgh, Scotland.

== List ==
Name	Location	Date Listed	Grid Ref. (Note: Sometimes known as OSGB36, the grid reference (where provided) is based on the British national grid reference system used by the Ordnance Survey. • "Guide to National Grid". Ordnance Survey. • "Get-a-map". Ordnance Survey.)	Geo-coordinates	Notes	LB Number (Note: Historic Environment Scotland assign a unique alphanumeric identifier to each designated site in Scotland, for listed buildings this always begins with "LB", for example "LB12345".)	Image
2 Dewar Place, Scottish Power Offices, Formerly Central Electricity Lighting Station Including Boundary Walls, Gates And Gatepiers				55°56′48″N 3°12′39″W	Category B	47721	Upload Photo
266-270 (Even Nos) Morrison Street				55°56′47″N 3°12′57″W	Category C(S)	47727	Upload Photo
West Terrace (Next To Rosebery Memorial Wall), Drinking Fountain, Garden, Wall And Railings				55°59′25″N 3°23′48″W	Category B	47795	Upload Photo
7-25 (Odd Nos) Forrest Road				55°56′46″N 3°11′29″W	Category C(S)	47863	Upload Photo
73-75 (Odd Nos) Grassmarket				55°56′51″N 3°11′41″W	Category B	47870	Upload Photo
20-30 (Even Nos) Grindlay Street				55°56′48″N 3°12′16″W	Category C(S)	47880	Upload Photo
32-42 (Even Nos) Grindlay Street				55°56′48″N 3°12′18″W	Category C(S)	47881	Upload Photo
1-11 (Inclusive Nos) Portsburgh Square, West Port				55°56′48″N 3°11′56″W	Category C(S)	47896	Upload Photo
5, 6 And 7 Bristo Place				55°56′47″N 3°11′25″W	Category B	48210	Upload Photo
Edinburgh Castle, Palace Block				55°56′53″N 3°11′58″W	Category A	48226	Upload another image
Edinburgh Castle Esplanade, 78Th Highlanders Memorial				55°56′56″N 3°11′49″W	Category B	48238	Upload another image See more images
Edinburgh Castle Esplanade, Scottish Horse Memorial				55°56′56″N 3°11′51″W	Category C(S)	48239	Upload another image See more images
20-26 (Even Nos) Forrest Road				55°56′45″N 3°11′27″W	Category C(S)	48242	Upload Photo
West Princes Street Gardens, Robert Louis Stevenson Memorial				55°57′00″N 3°12′08″W	Category A	48255	Upload another image
1 - 12 (Inclusive Nos) Regent Terrace Mews And 13 - 22 (Inclusive Nos) Royal Terrace Mews And Shared Cobbled Lane				55°57′21″N 3°10′31″W	Category B	48383	Upload Photo
23 - 42 (Inclusive Nos) Carlton Terrace Mews Including Shared Cobbled Courtyard And Lane				55°57′23″N 3°10′30″W	Category B	48384	Upload Photo
Comely Bank Road, St Stephen's Church (Church Of Scotland) And Hall				55°57′36″N 3°13′07″W	Category C(S)	48534	Upload Photo
Niddrie Mains Road, Thistle Foundation, 1-11 (Inclusive Nos), 14-18 (Inclusive Nos) Queen's Walk, 1-19 Chapel Court And 1-23 (Inclusive Nos) West Court And Covered Walkways				55°55′50″N 3°07′58″W	Category B	48687	Upload Photo
Corstorphine Road, Milestone On N Side				55°56′39″N 3°15′24″W	Category C(S)	48885	Upload Photo
1-7 (Inclusive Nos) Magdala Mews				55°56′53″N 3°13′21″W	Category C(S)	48893	Upload Photo
15-25 (Odd Nos) Murrayfield Avenue, Including Boundary Walls				55°56′52″N 3°14′15″W	Category C(S)	48895	Upload Photo
2-60 (Even Nos) Murrayfield Ave, Including Boundary Walls				55°56′48″N 3°14′14″W	Category C(S)	48897	Upload Photo
31 And 33 Ravelston Dykes Road				55°57′08″N 3°15′22″W	Category C(S)	48904	Upload Photo
9 Rosebery Crescent, Including Railings				55°56′48″N 3°13′09″W	Category C(S)	48909	Upload Photo
Roseburn Terrace/ Street, Car Showrooms				55°56′43″N 3°14′00″W	Category C(S)	48912	Upload Photo
6 Wester Coates Gardens, Including Boundary Walls				55°56′54″N 3°13′45″W	Category C(S)	48918	Upload Photo
2 And 3 Abercorn Gardens With Boundary Wall				55°57′18″N 3°08′25″W	Category B	49040	Upload Photo
3 And 4 Northfield Gardens				55°56′58″N 3°08′16″W	Category B	49044	Upload Photo
2-12 (Even Numbers) Restalrig Road South, 1-21 (Odd Numbers) Portobello Road, 1-16 (Inclusive Numbers) Piershill Square West, 1-14 (Inclusive Numbers) Piershill Square East With Boundary Walls And Railings				55°57′21″N 3°08′57″W	Category C(S)	49047	Upload Photo
34 And 34A Cockburn Street				55°57′02″N 3°11′22″W	Category B	49064	Upload Photo
9-13 (Inclusive Nos) Market Street, St Christopher's Hotel				55°57′03″N 3°11′25″W	Category B	49065	Upload Photo
27, 28 And 29 Gayfield Square Including Railings				55°57′33″N 3°11′06″W	Category A	49149	Upload Photo
30, 31 And 32 Gayfield Square Including Railings				55°57′33″N 3°11′05″W	Category A	49150	Upload Photo
21 Union Street Including Boundary Wall And Railings				55°57′30″N 3°11′10″W	Category B	49155	Upload Photo
4-25 (Inclusive Nos) Eglinton Crescent, Including Railings				55°56′56″N 3°13′14″W	Category B	49188	Upload another image
Royal Botanic Garden, Inverleith Row, Head Gardener's Cottage At East Gate				55°57′53″N 3°12′15″W	Category C(S)	49215	Upload Photo
Royal Botanic Garden, Arboretum Place, Inverleith Row, Inverleith Terrace And Inverleith Place, Boundary Walls, Gatepiers, Railings And Gates				55°57′53″N 3°12′14″W	Category C(S)	49217	Upload Photo
Niddrie Mains Road, Richmond Craigmillar Church (Church Of Scotland) And Hall With Boundary Wall And Railings And Gates				55°55′58″N 3°07′45″W	Category C(S)	49460	Upload Photo
23 And 23A Holyrood Park, St Leonard's Lodge				55°56′30″N 3°10′19″W	Category C(S)	49512	Upload another image
Holyrood Park, Wells O' Wearie Cottage				55°56′20″N 3°09′51″W	Category C(S)	49515	Upload Photo
Crewe Road South, 1, 2, And 3 Avenue Villas With Boundary Wall And Railings				55°57′33″N 3°13′36″W	Category C(S)	49516	Upload Photo
40-60 (Even Nos) Kingston Avenue, Upper Craigend Cottages With Boundary Walls				55°55′12″N 3°08′54″W	Category C(S)	49517	Upload Photo
100 The Wisp, Edmonstone House East Gates And Lodge				55°55′06″N 3°06′56″W	Category B	49519	Upload Photo
Colinton Road, Merchiston Castle School, Walled Garden And Store				55°54′34″N 3°15′10″W	Category B	49556	Upload Photo
Colinton Road, Merchiston Castle School, Ha-Ha And Steps Leading To Colinton Castle				55°54′38″N 3°15′17″W	Category C(S)	49557	Upload Photo
66 And 68 Dreghorn Loan, Laverockdale House With Garden Pavilion, Boundary Wall, Gatepiers And Garden Terrace				55°54′09″N 3°15′05″W	Category A	49562	Upload Photo
Redford Road, Dreghorn Barracks, Comprising Guard House, Barrack Block, Band Block, And Battalion Headquarters				55°54′12″N 3°14′24″W	Category C(S)	49566	Upload Photo
7 And 9 Woodhall Road, Ringlewood And Ledgrianach, With Boundary Walls				55°54′25″N 3°15′23″W	Category C(S)	49574	Upload Photo
31 Woodhall Road, Colthwaite, With Boundary Wall And Gates				55°54′21″N 3°15′31″W	Category C(S)	49575	Upload Photo
34 Woodhall Road, West Colinton Cottage, With Boundary Wall				55°54′19″N 3°15′37″W	Category C(S)	49576	Upload Photo
Fettes College, War Memorial				55°57′50″N 3°13′31″W	Category B	49632	Upload Photo
Dean Path, Vr Letter Box				55°57′09″N 3°13′06″W	Category B	49694	Upload Photo
2, 3, 4 Carlton Terrace Including Railings And Boundary Walls				55°57′21″N 3°10′27″W	Category A	49746	Upload Photo
6 Carlton Terrace Including Railings And Boundary Walls				55°57′22″N 3°10′25″W	Category A	49748	Upload Photo
11 Carlton Terrace Including Railings And Boundary Walls				55°57′23″N 3°10′25″W	Category A	49753	Upload Photo
18 Carlton Terrace Including Railings And Boundary Walls				55°57′24″N 3°10′30″W	Category A	49760	Upload another image
40-44 Montgomery Street And 42 Brunswick Street				55°57′33″N 3°10′50″W	Category C(S)	49762	Upload Photo
1-18 (Inclusive Nos) Montgomery Street Lane				55°57′32″N 3°10′57″W	Category C(S)	49764	Upload Photo
5 Regent Terrace Including Railings And Boundary Walls				55°57′16″N 3°10′40″W	Category A	49768	Upload another image
13 Regent Terrace, Including Railings And Boundary Walls				55°57′17″N 3°10′37″W	Category A	49776	Upload another image
18 Regent Terrace Including Railings And Boundary Walls				55°57′18″N 3°10′35″W	Category A	49781	Upload another image
20 Regent Terrace Including Railings And Boundary Walls				55°57′18″N 3°10′34″W	Category A	49783	Upload another image
25 Regent Terrace, Including Railings And Boundary Walls				55°57′19″N 3°10′32″W	Category A	49790	Upload another image
28 Regent Terrace, Including Railings And Boundary Walls				55°57′20″N 3°10′31″W	Category A	49793	Upload another image
30 Regent Terrace Including Railings And Boundary Walls				55°57′20″N 3°10′30″W	Category A	49795	Upload another image
33 Regent Terrace Including Railings And Boundary Walls				55°57′20″N 3°10′28″W	Category A	49798	Upload another image
4 Royal Terrace Including Railings And Boundary Walls				55°57′24″N 3°10′50″W	Category A	49802	Upload Photo
10 Royal Terrace Including Railings And Boundary Walls				55°57′24″N 3°10′47″W	Category A	49808	Upload Photo
11 And 12 Royal Terrace, Including Railings And Boundary Walls				55°57′24″N 3°10′46″W	Category A	49809	Upload Photo
14 Royal Terrace Including Railings And Boundary Walls				55°57′24″N 3°10′45″W	Category A	49811	Upload Photo
37 Royal Terrace Including Railings And Boundary Walls				55°57′24″N 3°10′33″W	Category A	49829	Upload Photo
41 Inverleith Gardens, Inverleith Parish Church And Boundary Wall				55°58′14″N 3°12′50″W	Category C(S)	50116	Upload Photo
35-57 (Odd Nos) Morton Street				55°56′51″N 3°05′56″W	Category C(S)	27113	Upload Photo
77 Belford Road, St Andrews Church (Roman Catholic), Including Boundary Walls				55°57′10″N 3°13′35″W	Category C(S)	50186	Upload another image
Glenogle Road, Glenogle Park (The Colonies), 1-30 (Inclusive) Avondale Place				55°57′41″N 3°12′27″W	Category B	50514	Upload Photo
Glenogle Road, Glenogle Park (The Colonies), 1-30 (Inclusive) Balmoral Place				55°57′41″N 3°12′32″W	Category B	50515	Upload Photo
Glenogle Road, Glenogle Park (The Colonies), 1-32 (Inclusive) Bell Place				55°57′41″N 3°12′24″W	Category B	50516	Upload Photo
Glenogle Road, Glenogle Park (The Colonies), 1-30 (Inclusive) Collins Place				55°57′41″N 3°12′34″W	Category B	50517	Upload Photo
Glenogle Road, Glenogle Park (The Colonies), 1-30 (Inclusive) Colville Place				55°57′42″N 3°12′36″W	Category B	50518	Upload Photo
Glenogle Road, Glenogle Park (The Colonies), 1-30 (Inclusive) Dunrobin Place				55°57′41″N 3°12′30″W	Category B	50519	Upload Photo
Glenogle Road, Glenogle Park (The Colonies), 1-8 (Inclusive) Glenogle Place				55°57′42″N 3°12′21″W	Category B	50521	Upload Photo
Glenogle Road, Glenogle Park (The Colonies), 1-33 (Inclusive) Hugh Miller Place				55°57′40″N 3°12′39″W	Category B	50523	Upload Photo
Glenogle Road, Glenogle Park (The Colonies), 1-30 (Inclusive) Kemp Place				55°57′42″N 3°12′25″W	Category B	50524	Upload Photo
Glenogle Road, Glenogle Park (The Colonies), 1-40 (Inclusive) Reid Terrace And 1-8 (Inclusive) Bridge Place				55°57′39″N 3°12′40″W	Category B	50525	Upload Photo
Glenogle Road, Glenogle Park (The Colonies), 1-30 (Inclusive) Teviotdale Place				55°57′42″N 3°12′29″W	Category B	50527	Upload Photo
Torduff Road, Torduff Reservoir Filtering Cistern				55°53′47″N 3°16′02″W	Category C(S)	50528	Upload Photo
1-17 (Inclusive Nos) Tron Square (Lower And Upper)				55°56′57″N 3°11′18″W	Category B	50778	Upload Photo
Shore Road, Port Edgar, West Pier				55°59′38″N 3°24′49″W	Category C(S)	50857	Upload Photo
Belhaven Place, Gatepiers And Railings Formerly To Morningside Cemetery				55°55′30″N 3°12′43″W	Category C(S)	50969	Upload Photo
Shore Road, Port Edgar, Former Barracks / Naval Hospital Including Officers Ward, Ward Blocks, Admin Block, Recreation Rooms, Air Raid Shelter, Latrine, Victualling Store, Guard Room And Boiler House				55°59′36″N 3°25′04″W	Category B	50988	Upload Photo
1-15 (Inclusive Nos) Saxe Coburg Place Including Boundary Walls And Railings And Retaining Wall And Railings To Central Communal Garden				55°57′36″N 3°12′30″W	Category A	29763	Upload Photo
12 East London Street, British Telecom, Waverley Telephone Exchange Including Boundary Walls And Ancillary Building				55°57′36″N 3°11′17″W	Category B	51018	Upload Photo
Canongate, 1 And 2 Chessel's Court (W Block)				55°57′03″N 3°10′59″W	Category A	51171	Upload Photo
65-71 (Odd Nos) And 97-103 (Odd Nos) Canongate Including 1-3 (Inclusive Nos) Brown's Close				55°57′07″N 3°10′41″W	Category B	51172	Upload Photo
242-244 (Even Nos) Canongate, (Chessel's Court N Block)				55°57′02″N 3°10′59″W	Category B	51173	Upload Photo
12, 13 Belford Mews				55°57′06″N 3°13′10″W	Category C(S)	51338	Upload Photo
6, 8 Shandwick Place				55°57′01″N 3°12′32″W	Category C(S)	51342	Upload Photo
1-8 (Consecutive Numbers) Belford Mews				55°57′06″N 3°13′12″W	Category B	51343	Upload another image
69 Dean Path, Former Dean Cemetery Gate Lodge, Including Boundary Walls				55°57′17″N 3°13′19″W	Category C(S)	51394	Upload Photo
2-6 (Inclusive Nos) North Bank Street And Wardrop's Court, Blackie House				55°57′00″N 3°11′36″W	Category A	51522	Upload Photo
1-63 (Inclusive Nos) Claremont Court Including Lockup Garages				55°57′53″N 3°11′24″W	Category C(S)	51772	Upload Photo
1-16 (Inclusive Nos) Salvesen Crescent, Including Boundary Walls And Gatepiers				55°58′31″N 3°15′31″W	Category B	45601	Upload Photo
Drummond Place, Police Box				55°57′30″N 3°11′47″W	Category B	45479	Upload Photo
2B Jamaica Street, Pindi's Restaurant And Bar				55°57′21″N 3°12′10″W	Category C(S)	45503	Upload Photo
1-8 Baberton Mains, Including Boundary Walls And Gatepiers				55°54′43″N 3°17′47″W	Category B	45416	Upload Photo
Riccarton Mains, Including Stable Block, Cottage And Cattle Shed				55°54′43″N 3°18′39″W	Category C(S)	45426	Upload Photo
Dalmeny House, Boundary Wall				55°59′05″N 3°21′35″W	Category B	45436	Upload Photo
88 Fountainbridge, 1- 8 Chalmers Buildings				55°56′39″N 3°12′27″W	Category C(S)	44932	Upload Photo
76 Clermiston, Road, Hillwood, Including Boundary Walls, Gatepiers, Gates And Lanterns				55°56′53″N 3°16′46″W	Category C(S)	44747	Upload Photo
134 Corstorphine Road, Edinburgh Zoo (Royal Zoological Society Of Scotland) Pair Of Toilets Flanking West Lodge Complex				55°56′42″N 3°16′19″W	Category C(S)	44752	Upload Photo
30 Old Kirk Road, Including Boundary Walls, Gatepiers And Gates				55°56′41″N 3°16′32″W	Category B	44754	Upload Photo
3 And 5A-G Loaning Road, Former Factory Complex				55°57′34″N 3°08′55″W	Category C(S)	44626	Upload Photo
12 And 13 South Gray Street, Including Boundary Walls And Pedestrian Gates				55°56′03″N 3°10′34″W	Category B	44256	Upload Photo
12 And 13 Ventnor Terrace, Including Railings				55°55′54″N 3°10′10″W	Category C(S)	44438	Upload Photo
50, 50A And 52 Craigmillar Park, Including Boundary Walls				55°55′40″N 3°10′07″W	Category C(S)	44209	Upload Photo
17-21 (Odd Nos) Crawfurd Road, Including Boundary Walls				55°55′52″N 3°10′06″W	Category C(S)	44211	Upload Photo
10 Mayfield Gardens, Including Boundary Walls				55°55′57″N 3°10′25″W	Category C(S)	44225	Upload Photo
19 And 20 Meadow Place Including Boundary Walls				55°56′20″N 3°11′34″W	Category B	43848	Upload another image
Queen Street, 2 York Buildings				55°57′21″N 3°11′38″W	Category B	43887	Upload Photo
4 And 5 Riverside And 6 Cramond Village				55°58′47″N 3°18′03″W	Category B	43937	Upload Photo
10 Gamekeeper's Road, Lauderdale, Including Boundary Wall And Gatepiers				55°58′21″N 3°17′48″W	Category C(S)	43939	Upload Photo
181, 181A And 183 Whitehouse Road, Royal Burgess Golf Club House Including Union House, Store, Boundary Wall And Gatepiers				55°57′44″N 3°18′21″W	Category B	43941	Upload Photo
90 And 92 Trafalgar Lane; Eh6 4Dq				55°58′25″N 3°11′16″W	Category C(S)	43678	Upload Photo
1-4 (Inclusive Nos) Craighall Bank Including Boundary Wall				55°58′33″N 3°11′45″W	Category C(S)	43688	Upload Photo
6 Fishmarket Square And 1 Pier Place				55°58′51″N 3°11′42″W	Category C(S)	43695	Upload Photo
7 And 8 Fishmarket Square				55°58′50″N 3°11′41″W	Category C(S)	43696	Upload Photo
14-20 (Even Nos) Great Michael Rise				55°58′46″N 3°11′31″W	Category B	43701	Upload Photo
24-38 (Even Nos) Newhaven Main Street				55°58′50″N 3°11′39″W	Category C(S)	43706	Upload Photo
46 Newhaven Main Street				55°58′50″N 3°11′47″W	Category C(S)	43708	Upload Photo
46 Park Road, Newhaven, Including Gatepiers And Gate				55°58′46″N 3°11′50″W	Category C(S)	43721	Upload Photo
Newcraighall Road, Craigmillar Arts Centre, Former St Andrew's Church, Including Gatepiers And Boundary Walls				55°55′58″N 3°06′17″W	Category B	43571	Upload Photo
Newcraighall Road, Niddrie Cottages				55°56′00″N 3°06′12″W	Category C(S)	43572	Upload Photo
24 Hill Street				55°57′12″N 3°12′11″W	Category A	43305	Upload Photo
106 Princes Street				55°57′06″N 3°12′04″W	Category B	43324	Upload Photo
66 Rose Street, Hanover Buildings (John Menzies Plc)				55°57′09″N 3°11′54″W	Category B	43337	Upload Photo
172-176 (Even Nos) Rose Street				55°57′05″N 3°12′15″W	Category B	43340	Upload Photo
42 And 44 Rose Street North Lane				55°57′10″N 3°11′57″W	Category C(S)	43345	Upload Photo
108 And 110 Rose Street North Lane				55°57′07″N 3°12′15″W	Category C(S)	43346	Upload Photo
6 And 7 St Andrew Square And 7-19 South St David Street				55°57′12″N 3°11′36″W	Category B	43348	Upload Photo
5-17 (Odd Nos) West Register Street				55°57′13″N 3°11′25″W	Category C(S)	43365	Upload another image
20 Young Street, Cambridge Bar				55°57′10″N 3°12′21″W	Category A	43369	Upload Photo
1 And 3 Claverhouse Drive With Boundary Walls				55°55′01″N 3°09′13″W	Category C(S)	43234	Upload Photo
Gilmerton, 49-51 Drum Street, The Royal Bank Of Scotland				55°54′19″N 3°07′55″W	Category C(S)	43256	Upload Photo
Gilmerton, 6 Ravenscroft Street, Gilmerton Parish Church With Boundary Walls And Gatepiers				55°54′18″N 3°07′59″W	Category C(S)	43259	Upload Photo
Gilmerton, 41 Ravenscroft Street				55°54′15″N 3°08′01″W	Category C(S)	43260	Upload Photo
Gilmerton Road, The George And Agnes Murray Home With Sundial, Stable Court, Lodge And Gatepiers				55°54′32″N 3°08′26″W	Category B	43262	Upload Photo
23 Castle Street				55°57′07″N 3°12′10″W	Category B	43280	Upload Photo
30-32 (Even Nos) Frederick Street				55°57′09″N 3°12′02″W	Category B	43283	Upload Photo
87 George Street And 15 Hill Street Lane South				55°57′11″N 3°12′07″W	Category A	43287	Upload Photo
3-9 (Odd Nos) Hanover Street				55°57′09″N 3°11′47″W	Category B	43291	Upload Photo

== Key ==
The scheme for classifying buildings in Scotland is:

- Category A: "buildings of national or international importance, either architectural or historic; or fine, little-altered examples of some particular period, style or building type."
- Category B: "buildings of regional or more than local importance; or major examples of some particular period, style or building type, which may have been altered."
- Category C: "buildings of local importance; lesser examples of any period, style, or building type, as originally constructed or moderately altered; and simple traditional buildings which group well with other listed buildings."

In March 2016 there were 47,288 listed buildings in Scotland. Of these, 8% were Category A, and 50% were Category B, with the remaining 42% being Category C.

== See also ==
- List of listed buildings in Edinburgh
