= List of listed buildings in Edinburgh/9 =

This is a list of listed buildings in Edinburgh, Scotland.

== List ==
Name	Location	Date listed	Grid ref. (Note: Sometimes known as OSGB36, the grid reference (where provided) is based on the British national grid reference system used by the Ordnance Survey. • "Guide to National Grid". Ordnance Survey. • "Get-a-map". Ordnance Survey.)	Geo-coordinates	Notes	LB number (Note: Historic Environment Scotland assign a unique alphanumeric identifier to each designated site in Scotland, for listed buildings this always begins with "LB", for example "LB12345".)	Image
1-11 (Inclusive Nos) St Colme Street, Including Railings				55°57′12″N 3°12′30″W	Category A	29724	Upload another image
1-96 (Inclusive Nos) Rosemount Buildings				55°56′40″N 3°12′37″W	Category B	29662	Upload another image
9, 10, 11, 12, 13, 14, 15, 16 Rothesay Terrace				55°57′02″N 3°13′07″W	Category B	29671	Upload Photo
1-13A (Inclusive Nos) Royal Crescent, 24 And 24A Dundonald Street And 26-28 (Even Nos) Scotland Street, Including Railings And Lamps				55°57′34″N 3°11′48″W	Category A	29679	Upload Photo
1-8 (Inclusive Nos) Randolph Place, And 1 Randolph Crescent, Including Railings, With 1, 1A Randolph Lane				55°57′05″N 3°12′37″W	Category A	29602	Upload another image
Gilmerton, 96 Ravenscroft Street, Annville				55°54′12″N 3°08′08″W	Category C(S)	29608	Upload Photo
Richmond Street West 7-15A And 1-9 Davie Street				55°56′43″N 3°11′01″W	Category B	29628	Upload Photo
10-14 (Even Nos) Robertson's Close				55°56′54″N 3°11′10″W	Category B	29630	Upload Photo
55 And 57 Rose Street And 41 Rose Street North Lane, Rose Street Brewery				55°57′09″N 3°11′56″W	Category B	29633	Upload another image
110-114 (Even Nos) Rose Street And 72 Rose Street South Lane				55°57′07″N 3°12′03″W	Category B	29647	Upload Photo
138-142 (Even Nos) Rose Street				55°57′07″N 3°12′06″W	Category B	29649	Upload Photo
170 Rose Street And 116-122 (Even Nos) Rose Street South Lane				55°57′05″N 3°12′14″W	Category B	29652	Upload another image
2 And 3 Rosebery Crescent, Including Railings				55°56′46″N 3°13′08″W	Category C(S)	29658	Upload Photo
4 And 5 Rosebery Crescent, Including Railings				55°56′47″N 3°13′08″W	Category C(S)	29659	Upload Photo
30 And 31 Queen Street And Railings				55°57′16″N 3°12′00″W	Category B	29549	Upload Photo
60 Queen Street And 58A, 60 And 62 North Castle Street				55°57′13″N 3°12′16″W	Category A	29566	Upload Photo
4, 5, 6, 7, 8 Queensferry Street				55°57′01″N 3°12′33″W	Category B	29577	Upload Photo
31, 31A And 33 Raeburn Place				55°57′32″N 3°12′42″W	Category C(S)	29582	Upload Photo
32, 34 And 34A Raeburn Place, Including Boundary Walls				55°57′33″N 3°12′41″W	Category C(S)	29587	Upload Photo
Raeburn Place, 40, 42				55°57′34″N 3°12′42″W	Category B	29588	Upload Photo
Raeburn Place, 112, Raeburn House, Formerly Somerset Cottage				55°57′34″N 3°12′53″W	Category B	29590	Upload Photo
1-3 (Inclusive Nos) Ramsay Garden				55°56′58″N 3°11′47″W	Category A	29593	Upload another image See more images
10, 10A Randolph Cliff, Deanbrae House, Miller Row, Bell's Brae, Including Boundary Wall				55°57′09″N 3°12′51″W	Category B	29598	Upload another image
2-9A (Inclusive Nos) Randolph Cliff, Including Railings				55°57′08″N 3°12′47″W	Category A	29599	Upload another image
2-14 (Inclusive) Parkside Street And 66-72 (Even) St Leonard's Street				55°56′30″N 3°10′40″W	Category C(S)	29479	Upload Photo
40 Pentland Avenue, Westfield, With Boundary Wall And Gatepiers				55°54′28″N 3°15′55″W	Category B	29484	Upload Photo
6 Westmost Close				55°58′50″N 3°11′45″W	Category C(S)	29492	Upload Photo
22-28 (Even Nos) Pilrig Street And Boundary Walls				55°57′51″N 3°10′45″W	Category B	29495	Upload Photo
94-96 (Inclusive Nos) Princes Street				55°57′07″N 3°11′57″W	Category A	29507	Upload Photo
99 And 99A Princes Street And 2 And 4 Frederick Street				55°57′06″N 3°12′00″W	Category B	29509	Upload Photo
112 Princes Street, Debenham's (Former Conservative Club)				55°57′05″N 3°12′08″W	Category B	29512	Upload another image
123 Princes Street				55°57′04″N 3°12′15″W	Category B	29513	Upload Photo
Quality Street 13-19 Davidson's Mains, Raeburn Cottage And Dover Cottage				55°57′49″N 3°16′24″W	Category B	29527	Upload Photo
Quality Street 21-27 (Odd Nos) Davidson's Mains Myrtlebank And Ryedale With Railings				55°57′50″N 3°16′24″W	Category B	29528	Upload Photo
16 Queen Street With Railings				55°57′18″N 3°11′51″W	Category B	29540	Upload Photo
19-33 (Odd Nos) Northumberland Street, Including Railings And Lamps				55°57′26″N 3°11′52″W	Category A	29447	Upload another image
39-41 (Odd Nos) Northumberland Street, Including Railings And Lamp				55°57′25″N 3°11′59″W	Category A	29448	Upload Photo
6-12 (Even Nos) Northumberland Street, Including Railings And Lamp				55°57′25″N 3°11′50″W	Category A	29454	Upload Photo
38-40A (Even Nos) Northumberland Street, Including Railings And Lamps				55°57′24″N 3°11′59″W	Category A	29457	Upload Photo
Old Church Lane, Duddingston Manse And Boundary Wall, Duddingston				55°56′28″N 3°08′49″W	Category B	29468	Upload Photo
Duddingston Loch, The Thomson Tower				55°56′26″N 3°08′54″W	Category B	29469	Upload another image
176 Newhaven Road Including Boundary Wall				55°58′36″N 3°11′31″W	Category C(S)	29396	Upload Photo
3-6 (Inclusive Nos) West Newington Place				55°56′16″N 3°10′46″W	Category B	29404	Upload Photo
39-47 (Odd Nos), 53-73 (Odd Nos) Newington Road And 4 East Newington Place				55°56′18″N 3°10′42″W	Category B	29406	Upload another image
10 Newington Road, Jaipur Mansion Restaurant				55°57′01″N 3°11′21″W	Category B	29408	Upload Photo
7-11 (Inclusive Nos) Nicolson Square				55°56′46″N 3°11′10″W	Category C(S)	29413	Upload Photo
Nicolson Street, 78 And 1-5 West Richmond Street				55°56′43″N 3°11′02″W	Category B	29420	Upload Photo
Nicolson Street, 80-84				55°56′42″N 3°11′02″W	Category B	29421	Upload Photo
Nicolson Street, 100, 102				55°56′41″N 3°11′01″W	Category B	29424	Upload Photo
Nicolson Street, 110-122				55°56′40″N 3°11′01″W	Category B	29427	Upload Photo
Nicolson Street, 134-140 And 48 East Crosscauseway				55°56′38″N 3°11′00″W	Category B	29430	Upload Photo
14 Minto Street, Including Boundary Walls				55°56′08″N 3°10′33″W	Category B	29346	Upload Photo
23, 23A And 23B Minto Street Including Boundary Walls And Pedestrian Gate				55°56′04″N 3°10′28″W	Category B	29353	Upload Photo
47 Minto Street, Including Boundary Wall And Pedestrian Gateway				55°56′12″N 3°10′39″W	Category B	29361	Upload another image
19-36A (Inclusive Nos) Moray Place, Including Railings And Lamps				55°57′19″N 3°12′36″W	Category A	29369	Upload another image
Meadow Lane Hope Park Halls				55°56′32″N 3°11′11″W	Category B	29317	Upload another image
7, 8, 9 Melville Crescent, 42 Melville Street, 17 Walker Street Including Railings And Arched Lamp Holders				55°56′58″N 3°12′48″W	Category A	29321	Upload another image
2-24 (Even Numbers) Melville Street, 21, 22 Queensferry Street. 31 Stafford Street, Including Railings And Arched Lamp Holders				55°57′02″N 3°12′41″W	Category A	29326	Upload another image
2 - 12 (Even Nos) Middleby Street, Including Boundary Walls				55°56′04″N 3°10′32″W	Category A	29334	Upload Photo
2 Minto Street, Including Boundary Walls				55°56′14″N 3°10′39″W	Category C(S)	29337	Upload Photo
6 Minto Street, Including Boundary Walls				55°56′12″N 3°10′36″W	Category B	29341	Upload Photo
8 Newhaven Main Street				55°58′49″N 3°11′34″W	Category C(S)	29287	Upload Photo
1-10A (Inclusive Nos) West Maitland Street				55°56′49″N 3°12′55″W	Category B	29290	Upload Photo
31 And 32 West Maitland Street, Including Railings To Palmerston Place				55°56′49″N 3°12′56″W	Category B	29293	Upload Photo
Malta Terrace, 3-9				55°57′35″N 3°12′36″W	Category B	29295	Upload Photo
3-17 (Odd Numbers) Manor Place				55°56′53″N 3°12′51″W	Category A	29296	Upload Photo
19-29 (Odd Numbers) Manor Place Including Railings				55°56′55″N 3°12′53″W	Category A	29297	Upload Photo
1-10 Mansfield Place, Including Railings				55°57′35″N 3°11′30″W	Category A	29302	Upload Photo
Mary's Place, 3-6				55°57′32″N 3°12′51″W	Category B	29307	Upload Photo
38 Mayfield Terrace, Newington Lodge, Including Boundary Walls, Gatepiers, And Entablatured Entrance Gate				55°56′07″N 3°10′10″W	Category B	29314	Upload Photo
1, 1A, 2 Lynedoch Place				55°57′06″N 3°12′46″W	Category B	29274	Upload Photo
Lanark Road 547 Gowanlea				55°54′10″N 3°17′11″W	Category B	29205	Upload Photo
Lauriston Park 1-12				55°56′38″N 3°12′03″W	Category B	29214	Upload Photo
38-44 Lauriston Place, Including Boundary Wall, Railings And Gates				55°56′42″N 3°11′49″W	Category B	29219	Upload another image
437-449 (Odd Nos) Lawnmarket, Including Part Of 451 Lawnmarket To Rear				55°56′59″N 3°11′35″W	Category B	29228	Upload another image
330 Lawnmarket				55°56′57″N 3°11′38″W	Category B	29243	Upload Photo
Inverleith Place 39				55°58′03″N 3°12′35″W	Category B	29151	Upload Photo
Inverleith Row, 21 And 22				55°58′02″N 3°12′20″W	Category B	29167	Upload Photo
Inverleith Row, 28 And 29				55°58′04″N 3°12′22″W	Category B	29171	Upload Photo
Inverleith Row, 36 And 37				55°58′07″N 3°12′25″W	Category B	29174	Upload Photo
Inverleith Row, 52 And 53				55°58′12″N 3°12′30″W	Category B	29181	Upload Photo
Inverleith Row 54, 55				55°58′13″N 3°12′31″W	Category C(S)	29182	Upload Photo
Inverleith Terrace, 7, 8				55°57′50″N 3°12′10″W	Category C(S)	29185	Upload Photo
2-10 (Even Nos) Keir Street, Including Boundary Wall And Railings				55°56′44″N 3°11′48″W	Category B	29197	Upload Photo
1 And 3 Hill Street				55°57′13″N 3°12′07″W	Category A	29080	Upload Photo
15A-25 (Inclusive Nos) Hillside Crescent				55°57′30″N 3°10′40″W	Category B	29087	Upload Photo
2 And 4 Hope Street And 46 Queensferry Street				55°57′02″N 3°12′31″W	Category B	29092	Upload Photo
Hope Park Square 6 And 8A				55°56′32″N 3°11′09″W	Category B	29096	Upload another image
7,7A, 8 And 8A Hopetoun Crescent And Railings				55°57′41″N 3°11′05″W	Category A	29098	Upload Photo
17 And 18 Hopetoun Crescent With Railings				55°57′43″N 3°11′00″W	Category A	29099	Upload Photo
3-7 (Odd Nos) Howe Street, Including Railings				55°57′21″N 3°12′06″W	Category A	29107	Upload Photo
21-23B (Odd Nos) Howe Street, And 71 And 75 Northumberland Street, Including Railings				55°57′24″N 3°12′07″W	Category A	29112	Upload Photo
28 And 30 Howe Street, Including Railings				55°57′23″N 3°12′10″W	Category B	29120	Upload Photo
45 High Street, John Knox House				55°57′02″N 3°11′06″W	Category A	29033	Upload another image
57 And 59 High Street				55°57′02″N 3°11′07″W	Category B	29035	Upload another image
High Street, 7 Old Fishmarket Close				55°56′57″N 3°11′22″W	Category B	29042	Upload Photo
209-213 (Odd Nos) High Street Including 1-6 (Inclusive Nos) Jackson's Close				55°57′01″N 3°11′20″W	Category A	29046	Upload Photo
48 And 50 High Street				55°57′01″N 3°11′09″W	Category B	29066	Upload Photo
126-140 (Even Nos) High Street				55°56′59″N 3°11′19″W	Category B	29067	Upload Photo
14-18 (Even Nos) Grove Street, Including Railings				55°56′43″N 3°12′47″W	Category B	28982	Upload Photo
Hamilton Place 6-10 And 1-6 Glanville Place				55°57′28″N 3°12′29″W	Category B	28992	Upload Photo
3 And 5 Hamilton Place				55°57′31″N 3°12′30″W	Category B	28993	Upload Photo
Hamilton Place 18-26				55°57′30″N 3°12′28″W	Category B	28995	Upload Photo
71 Hanover Street With Railings				55°57′14″N 3°11′50″W	Category A	28999	Upload Photo
56-60 Henderson Row				55°57′36″N 3°12′21″W	Category B	29023	Upload Photo
1-6 (Inclusive Nos) Grosvenor Gardens, Including Railings				55°56′47″N 3°13′12″W	Category B	28975	Upload Photo
1-25 (Odd Nos) Grosvenor Street, Including Railings				55°56′48″N 3°13′00″W	Category B	28977	Upload Photo
Glenogle Road And Saxe-Coburg Place, Glenogle Swim Centre Including Stack				55°57′40″N 3°12′33″W	Category B	28924	Upload Photo
1 Grassmarket And 2 King's Stables Road				55°56′50″N 3°11′54″W	Category C(S)	28932	Upload Photo
9 Grassmarket And 3-9 (Odd Nos) West Port, Including The Fiddlers Arms				55°56′49″N 3°11′53″W	Category B	28934	Upload another image
26 And 28 Grassmarket				55°56′51″N 3°11′49″W	Category B	28937	Upload another image
74-84 (Even Nos) Grassmarket				55°56′52″N 3°11′43″W	Category B	28942	Upload another image
4A And 4B South Gray Street, Including Boundary Walls And Pedestrian Gateway				55°56′04″N 3°10′38″W	Category B	28944	Upload Photo
27 And 29 Upper Gray Street, Including Boundary Walls				55°56′10″N 3°10′41″W	Category B	28955	Upload Photo
40 And 42 Upper Gray Street Including Boundary Walls				55°56′08″N 3°10′42″W	Category C(S)	28961	Upload Photo
2-42A (Even Nos) Great King Street And 45-51 (Odd Nos) Dundas Street, Including Railings And Lamps With 6 South East Cumberland Street Lane, Including Walls				55°57′30″N 3°11′53″W	Category A	28964	Upload Photo
67 George Street				55°57′12″N 3°12′00″W	Category B	28843	Upload another image
109 George Street And 34 And 34A North Castle Street With Railings				55°57′09″N 3°12′15″W	Category B	28852	Upload Photo
127 And 129 George Street With Railings And Lamp Standards				55°57′09″N 3°12′20″W	Category B	28857	Upload Photo
22 And 24 George Street, The Royal Society				55°57′12″N 3°11′47″W	Category A	28864	Upload Photo
30, 30A And 32 George Street And 54 And 56 Hanover Street				55°57′12″N 3°11′51″W	Category A	28866	Upload Photo
62-66 (Even Nos) George Street, Bank Of Scotland, Including 48 Rose Street North Lane				55°57′10″N 3°11′58″W	Category A	28873	Upload Photo
78 And 80 George Street, National Westminster Bank				55°57′09″N 3°12′04″W	Category A	28876	Upload another image
21-25 (Inclusive Nos) George Iv Bridge, 17 Merchant Street And 31 And 33 Candlemaker Row				55°56′51″N 3°11′31″W	Category B	28889	Upload another image
31-39 George Iv Bridge				55°56′51″N 3°11′28″W	Category C(S)	28892	Upload Photo
26 Gillespie Road, The Hermitage, With Boundary Wall, Gatepiers, Garden Gate And Garage				55°54′27″N 3°16′07″W	Category B	28899	Upload Photo
31-37 (Odd Nos) Gilmore Place Including Boundary Walls				55°56′29″N 3°12′21″W	Category C(S)	28906	Upload Photo
67 And 69 Gilmore Place Including Boundary Walls				55°56′28″N 3°12′32″W	Category C(S)	28907	Upload Photo
71 And 73 Gilmore Place Including Boundary Walls				55°56′27″N 3°12′33″W	Category C(S)	28909	Upload Photo
44 Gilmore Place Including Boundary Wall				55°56′29″N 3°12′28″W	Category C(S)	28914	Upload Photo
21 And 23 Upper Gilmore Place Including Boundary Walls				55°56′26″N 3°12′28″W	Category B	28919	Upload Photo
37-41 (Odd Nos) Frederick Street With Railings				55°57′12″N 3°12′01″W	Category B	28784	Upload Photo
1-25A (Inclusive Nos) Gardner's Crescent And 109-115 (Odd Nos) Morrison Street Including Railings				55°56′45″N 3°12′38″W	Category A	28797	Upload another image
5 Gayfield Square Including Boundary Wall, Railings, Gatepiers And Overthrow				55°57′32″N 3°11′11″W	Category B	28801	Upload Photo
18-20 (Inclusive Nos) Gayfield Square Including Railings				55°57′35″N 3°11′08″W	Category B	28806	Upload Photo
George Square 16 And 17				55°56′38″N 3°11′27″W	Category A	28809	Upload another image
George Square 25				55°56′35″N 3°11′25″W	Category A	28818	Upload another image
George Square 60				55°56′40″N 3°11′15″W	Category A	28827	Upload another image
3 George Street (Incorporating Former No 13), Standard Life				55°57′15″N 3°11′43″W	Category A	28829	Upload Photo
49-55 (Odd Nos) George Street				55°57′13″N 3°11′56″W	Category B	28838	Upload another image
8-10A (Even Nos) Dundonald Street, Including Railings And Lamp				55°57′33″N 3°11′47″W	Category B	28725	Upload Photo
25-29 (Inclusive Nos) Elm Row And 1-5 (Odd Nos) Montgomery Street				55°57′34″N 3°10′58″W	Category C(S)	28735	Upload Photo
146 And 148 Ferry Road Including Boundary Walls				55°58′28″N 3°11′12″W	Category B	28746	Upload Photo
Ferry Road, 378, 380				55°58′16″N 3°12′45″W	Category C(S)	28752	Upload Photo
492 Ferry Road, Ashbrook, Including Gatepiers And Boundary Wall				55°58′13″N 3°13′26″W	Category B	28753	Upload Photo
13-24 (Inclusive Nos) Fettes Row, And 104 And 106 Dundas Street, Including Railings And Lamps With 11 North West Cumberland Street Lane				55°57′32″N 3°12′06″W	Category B	28755	Upload Photo
2 Fishmarket Square				55°58′50″N 3°11′42″W	Category C(S)	28765	Upload Photo
23-37 (Inclusive Numbers) Drumsheugh Gardens, Including Mews, Boundary Walls And Ancillary Buildings To Rear (Lynedoch Place Lane)				55°57′05″N 3°12′56″W	Category B	28676	Upload Photo
37A, 38, 39, 40, 41, 42, 43, 44 Drumsheugh Gardens, 1 Chester Street And 1 Rothesay Place, Including Railings, Ancillary Buildings And Boundary Walls To Rear				55°57′03″N 3°12′58″W	Category B	28677	Upload Photo
26-30 (Even Nos) Dublin Street, Including Railings				55°57′26″N 3°11′38″W	Category B	28692	Upload Photo

== Key ==
The scheme for classifying buildings in Scotland is:

- Category A: "buildings of national or international importance, either architectural or historic; or fine, little-altered examples of some particular period, style or building type."
- Category B: "buildings of regional or more than local importance; or major examples of some particular period, style or building type, which may have been altered."
- Category C: "buildings of local importance; lesser examples of any period, style, or building type, as originally constructed or moderately altered; and simple traditional buildings which group well with other listed buildings."

In March 2016 there were 47,288 listed buildings in Scotland. Of these, 8% were Category A, and 50% were Category B, with the remaining 42% being Category C.

== See also ==
- List of listed buildings in Edinburgh
