= List of listed buildings in Edinburgh/22 =

This is a list of listed buildings in Edinburgh, Scotland.

== List ==
Name	Location	Date listed	Grid ref. (Note: Sometimes known as OSGB36, the grid reference (where provided) is based on the British national grid reference system used by the Ordnance Survey. • "Guide to National Grid". Ordnance Survey. • "Get-a-map". Ordnance Survey.)	Geo-coordinates	Notes	LB number (Note: Historic Environment Scotland assign a unique alphanumeric identifier to each designated site in Scotland, for listed buildings this always begins with "LB", for example "LB12345".)	Image
Inverleith Row, 20				55°58′00″N 3°12′18″W	Category B	29166	Upload Photo
Inverleith Row, 23 And 24				55°58′02″N 3°12′20″W	Category B	29168	Upload Photo
39 Jamaica Street, Kay's Bar				55°57′21″N 3°12′18″W	Category B	29188	Upload Photo
Hill Place 3, 5				55°56′46″N 3°11′04″W	Category C(S)	29076	Upload Photo
11 Hillside Crescent Including Railings				55°57′30″N 3°10′44″W	Category A	29085	Upload Photo
26-37 (Inclusive Nos) Hillside Crescent				55°57′28″N 3°10′31″W	Category B	29088	Upload Photo
Hope Park Square 6-9 And Annfield House				55°56′31″N 3°11′09″W	Category B	29097	Upload another image
Howden Street 28-30 And Simon Square, Simon Square Centre (Buildings Of 1887 Fronting Howden Street Only)				55°56′40″N 3°10′56″W	Category C(S)	29106	Upload Photo
63-67 (Odd Nos) High Street And 1 Chalmer's Close, Carrubber's Close Mission				55°57′03″N 3°11′08″W	Category B	29036	Upload Photo
197-207 (Odd Nos) High Street Including 1-14 Fleshmarket Close				55°57′01″N 3°11′19″W	Category A	29045	Upload another image
221-231 (Odd Nos) High Street				55°57′00″N 3°11′21″W	Category A	29048	Upload Photo
367-381 (Odd Nos) High Street				55°56′59″N 3°11′30″W	Category A	29052	Upload another image
40 And 42 High Street				55°57′01″N 3°11′07″W	Category C(S)	29061	Upload Photo
17A-27A (Inclusive Nos) Haddington Place With 26 And 28 Annandale Street Lane				55°57′37″N 3°10′58″W	Category A	28984	Upload another image
28 And 30 Hanover Street				55°57′10″N 3°11′51″W	Category A	29007	Upload Photo
12 Hawthornbank Lane				55°57′07″N 3°13′00″W	Category C(S)	29019	Upload another image
1-5 (Odd Nos) Great Stuart Street, Including Railings And Lamps				55°57′14″N 3°12′36″W	Category A	28966	Upload another image
3 Upper Gray Street, Including Boundary Wall				55°56′13″N 3°10′45″W	Category C(S)	28951	Upload Photo
19 And 21 Upper Gray Street Including Boundary Walls				55°56′10″N 3°10′42″W	Category C(S)	28953	Upload Photo
81-85 (Odd Nos) George Street				55°57′11″N 3°12′07″W	Category B	28846	Upload Photo
88 And 88A George Street				55°57′09″N 3°12′07″W	Category B	28880	Upload Photo
17-19 (Inclusive Nos) George Iv Bridge And 5 Merchant Street				55°56′52″N 3°11′31″W	Category B	28888	Upload Photo
Gillespie Road, 33 East And West Muirend House Colinton				55°54′25″N 3°16′17″W	Category C(S)	28895	Upload Photo
25-29B (Odd Nos) Gilmore Place Including Boundary Walls				55°56′30″N 3°12′18″W	Category C(S)	28905	Upload Photo
7-13 (Odd Nos) Upper Gilmore Place Including Boundary Walls				55°56′25″N 3°12′31″W	Category B	28918	Upload Photo
158-164 (Even Nos) Fountainbridge And 90-92 (Even Nos) Grove Street				55°56′34″N 3°12′40″W	Category A	28778	Upload Photo
27-31 (Odd Nos) Frederick Street				55°57′09″N 3°11′59″W	Category B	28783	Upload Photo
43-49 (Odd Nos) Frederick Street With Railings And 49 Sw Thistle Street Lane				55°57′13″N 3°12′02″W	Category A	28785	Upload Photo
51-55 (Odd Nos) And 55A Frederick Street With Railings				55°57′14″N 3°12′02″W	Category B	28786	Upload Photo
24-28 (Even Nos) And 24A Frederick Street				55°57′09″N 3°12′02″W	Category B	28792	Upload Photo
23A And B George Square				55°56′36″N 3°11′26″W	Category A	28815	Upload another image
George Square 26				55°56′35″N 3°11′25″W	Category A	28819	Upload another image
35A, 37 And 37A George Street				55°57′13″N 3°11′53″W	Category B	28833	Upload Photo
45 George Street				55°57′13″N 3°11′55″W	Category A	28836	Upload Photo
9-13B (Odd Nos) Dundonald Street, And 2 And 2A Cumberland Street, Including Railings And Lamp				55°57′33″N 3°11′50″W	Category B	28724	Upload Photo
40-44 (Inclusive Nos) Elm Row, Gateway Theatre				55°57′35″N 3°10′56″W	Category C(S)	28736	Upload Photo
Eton Terrace 14 And 1 Lennox Street				55°57′19″N 3°12′48″W	Category A	28738	Upload Photo
Eyre Place 9-11				55°57′39″N 3°12′01″W	Category C(S)	28740	Upload Photo
Eyre Place 25-31				55°57′41″N 3°11′54″W	Category C(S)	28741	Upload Photo
27-35 (Inclusive Nos) Drummond Street				55°56′51″N 3°11′03″W	Category B	28672	Upload Photo
19, 20, 21, 22 Drumsheugh Gardens				55°57′05″N 3°12′49″W	Category B	28675	Upload Photo
17 And 17A Dublin Street, Including Railings				55°57′23″N 3°11′34″W	Category B	28681	Upload Photo
19 And 19A Dublin Street, Including Railings				55°57′24″N 3°11′34″W	Category B	28682	Upload Photo
63-69 (Odd Nos) Dublin Street, Including Railings With 1B Dublin Street Lane North				55°57′29″N 3°11′36″W	Category B	28686	Upload Photo
18 And 18A Dublin Street, Including Railings				55°57′23″N 3°11′37″W	Category B	28691	Upload Photo
64-68 (Even Nos) Dublin Street, Including Railings				55°57′28″N 3°11′40″W	Category B	28697	Upload Photo
23-23C Dundas Street, And 35 Northumberland Street Including Railings				55°57′25″N 3°11′56″W	Category A	28706	Upload Photo
61 Dreghorn Loan, Dunalistair				55°54′11″N 3°15′01″W	Category B	28660	Upload Photo
30 Cramond Glebe Road, The Cramond Inn, Including Outbuilding				55°58′47″N 3°18′00″W	Category B	28603	Upload Photo
60 Dalkeith Road, Arthur Lodge, Including Gatepiers And Boundary Walls				55°56′17″N 3°10′23″W	Category A	28622	Upload Photo
82 And 82A Dalkeith Road, Including Boundary Walls, Gatepiers And Carriage And Pedestrian Gates				55°56′13″N 3°10′17″W	Category B	28627	Upload Photo
27, 29 Dean Path				55°57′09″N 3°13′07″W	Category B	28635	Upload another image
302 Colinton Road With Boundary Wall And Railings				55°54′28″N 3°15′18″W	Category C(S)	28580	Upload Photo
139 Cowgate, Former Tailor's Hall				55°56′53″N 3°11′24″W	Category A	28595	Upload Photo
43-49 (Odd Nos) East Claremont Street				55°57′44″N 3°11′33″W	Category A	28534	Upload Photo
Clarence Street 3-19B				55°57′34″N 3°12′21″W	Category B	28537	Upload Photo
Clerk Street 2-18				55°56′35″N 3°10′58″W	Category B	28547	Upload Photo
352 Castlehill, Boswell's Court				55°56′56″N 3°11′44″W	Category A	28489	Upload another image
Duddingston Village, 46 The Causeway Including Gates, Gatepiers And Boundary Walls				55°56′34″N 3°08′51″W	Category C(S)	28494	Upload Photo
Causeway, The 58, 60 Poplar Bank And Dairy, Duddingston				55°56′32″N 3°08′55″W	Category B	28495	Upload Photo
5-9 (Odd Nos) South Charlotte Street With Railings				55°57′03″N 3°12′21″W	Category A	28512	Upload Photo
4 Castle Street				55°57′04″N 3°12′12″W	Category B	28469	Upload Photo
16-20 (Even Nos) And 20A Castle Street With Railings And Connery's Bar, Rose Street				55°57′06″N 3°12′13″W	Category A	28472	Upload Photo
118-124 Buccleuch Street				55°56′29″N 3°11′01″W	Category B	28403	Upload another image
11, 13 And 15 Blackfriars Street				55°57′00″N 3°11′09″W	Category B	28322	Upload Photo
23-29 (Odd Nos) Blackfriars Street				55°56′59″N 3°11′09″W	Category B	28324	Upload Photo
45-51 (Odd Nos) Blackfriars Street				55°56′59″N 3°11′08″W	Category B	28326	Upload Photo
Boroughloch Lane & Square Boroughloch Buildings				55°56′31″N 3°11′04″W	Category B	28336	Upload another image
19 Boswall Road, Boswall House With Boundary Walls, Railings, Gates And Gateposts				55°58′47″N 3°12′41″W	Category A	28338	Upload Photo
6, 8 And 10 Brighton Street				55°56′48″N 3°11′21″W	Category B	28351	Upload Photo
39 And 41 Broughton Street				55°57′27″N 3°11′18″W	Category B	28362	Upload Photo
2 Barnshot Road, Thirlestane With Boundary Wall, Railings, Gate Piers And Gate				55°54′23″N 3°15′27″W	Category B	28269	Upload Photo
1, 3 Alva Street, 12,13,14 Queensferry Street Including Boundary Walls To Rear				55°57′02″N 3°12′35″W	Category A	28235	Upload Photo
27, 29, 31 Alva Street, Including Railings				55°56′59″N 3°12′39″W	Category A	28237	Upload Photo
Ann Street 43				55°57′21″N 3°12′46″W	Category A	28243	Upload Photo
6-10A (Even Nos) Annandale Street				55°57′36″N 3°11′00″W	Category A	28254	Upload Photo
18-22A (Even Nos) Annandale Street				55°57′37″N 3°11′02″W	Category A	28255	Upload Photo
120, 122 And 124 (Even Nos) Swanston Road, Swanston Old Farm, Including Boundary Wall				55°53′35″N 3°13′00″W	Category B	28202	Upload Photo
1 And 1A Albany Street, And 23-27 (Odd Nos) Dublin Street, Including Railings				55°57′24″N 3°11′35″W	Category B	28217	Upload Photo
5-7B (Odd Nos) Albany Street, Including Railings And 23 Dublin Street Lane South				55°57′25″N 3°11′33″W	Category A	28219	Upload Photo
St Catherine's Balm Well Howdenhall Road				55°54′10″N 3°09′50″W	Category B	28122	Upload Photo
163 Newhaven Road, Victoria Park Lodge And Gatepiers				55°58′34″N 3°11′31″W	Category C(S)	28127	Upload Photo
Woodhall House Lodge Colinton				55°54′06″N 3°16′59″W	Category C(S)	28132	Upload Photo
91 Ravelston Dykes Road, Dovecot				55°57′09″N 3°15′19″W	Category B	28144	Upload Photo
Dreghorn Mains Farmhouse And Steading With Boundary Wall				55°53′54″N 3°14′35″W	Category C(S)	28168	Upload Photo
49 Ellen's Glen Road, Greenend House With Garden Walls				55°54′51″N 3°08′56″W	Category B	28175	Upload Photo
6 Lasswade Road, Kirk Farmhouse, Including Ancillary Structures And Boundary Wall				55°54′46″N 3°09′35″W	Category C(S)	28184	Upload Photo
Liberton Drive, Meadowhead Farmhouse and Steading				55°54′30″N 3°11′01″W	Category B	28190	Upload another image
Peffermill House Mill, Peffermill Road				55°55′57″N 3°08′48″W	Category B	28195	Upload Photo
Spylaw Farm House Off Gillespie Road Colinton				55°54′22″N 3°16′17″W	Category B	28199	Upload Photo
3/1 And 3/2 Kirk Cramond, Cramond House				55°58′42″N 3°17′51″W	Category B	28049	Upload Photo
Gilmerton, The Drum With Sundial				55°54′31″N 3°07′13″W	Category A	28052	Upload Photo
Gilmerton, The Drum, Walled Garden				55°54′27″N 3°07′26″W	Category C(S)	28056	Upload Photo
Gilmerton, The Drum, Icehouses				55°54′34″N 3°07′12″W	Category C(S)	28058	Upload Photo
Drylaw House, Stables Courtyard				55°57′53″N 3°15′10″W	Category B	28064	Upload Photo
Marchfield Hillhouse Road				55°57′47″N 3°16′03″W	Category B	28088	Upload Photo
232 Marionville Road, Marionville, Including Boundary Walls, Railings And Gates				55°57′32″N 3°09′15″W	Category A	28089	Upload Photo
71 Priestfield Road, Prestonfield House Hotel Including Gatepiers And Boundary Walls, Sundial, Garden Furniture And Memorial				55°56′12″N 3°09′26″W	Category A	28107	Upload another image
71 Priestfield Road, Prestonfield House, Former Stables				55°56′14″N 3°09′31″W	Category A	28108	Upload Photo
95 Ravelston Dykes Road, The Mary Erskine School (Formerly Ravelston House)				55°57′10″N 3°15′15″W	Category A	28110	Upload Photo
Colinton Road, Merchiston Castle School, House At Walled Garden				55°54′36″N 3°15′08″W	Category B	27986	Upload Photo
University Of Edinburgh Mcewan Hall Teviot Row And Teviot Place Including Railings Gates And Gatepiers Between Hall And Reid School Of Music				55°56′43″N 3°11′23″W	Category A	27993	Upload another image
18, 20 And 22 Chambers Street, University Of Edinburgh, Minto House, Including Railings, (Department Of Architecture And History Of Art)				55°56′52″N 3°11′22″W	Category B	27997	Upload Photo
Craiglockhart Castle Glenlockhart Road				55°55′10″N 3°14′18″W	Category B	28015	Upload Photo
Holyroodhouse, Abbey Court House				55°57′10″N 3°10′25″W	Category B	28027	Upload another image
Holyroodhouse, Abbeyhill, Queen Mary's Bath House				55°57′13″N 3°10′27″W	Category A	28028	Upload Photo
65 Bonaly Road, Bonaly Tower, With Boundary Walls, Gates, Bridge, Garden Terraces And Steps And Garden Statuary				55°53′51″N 3°15′34″W	Category A	28033	Upload another image
Cammo Road, Cammo Estate, Cammo House				55°57′29″N 3°19′28″W	Category B	28037	Upload Photo
The Innocent Railway, Cast Iron Bridge Over Braid Burn				55°56′11″N 3°08′39″W	Category B	27949	Upload Photo
Spylaw Street And Dell Road Bridge				55°54′30″N 3°15′24″W	Category B	27951	Upload Photo
3 Queensferry Road, Stewart's Melville College (Former Daniel Stewart's College), Art Room, North Gatelodge, Boundary Walls And Gates				55°57′17″N 3°13′36″W	Category A	27967	Upload another image
Lauriston Place, George Heriot's School, Chemistry Block				55°56′46″N 3°11′47″W	Category B	27977	Upload Photo
75 Belford Road, Scottish National Gallery of Modern Art, (former John Watson's School), including N and S gate lodges, piers and gates				55°57′04″N 3°13′31″W	Category A	27982	Upload another image
1 Pilrig Street With Boundary Wall And Railing				55°57′52″N 3°10′43″W	Category B	27843	Upload Photo
George Street And Hanover Street, Statue Of George Iv				55°57′13″N 3°11′50″W	Category A	27854	Upload another image
44 Queen Charlotte Street				55°58′24″N 3°10′04″W	Category C(S)	27873	Upload Photo
1 And 2 Shore And 2 Tower Street, Leith Signal Tower				55°58′39″N 3°10′08″W	Category A	27884	Upload Photo
45 And 46 Shore				55°58′33″N 3°10′12″W	Category B	27892	Upload Photo
Dr Andrew Balfour Drinking Fountain Klondyke Street Newcraighall				55°56′07″N 3°05′22″W	Category C(S)	27896	Upload Photo
45, 46 Timberbush				55°58′35″N 3°10′03″W	Category B	27902	Upload Photo
1-4 (Inclusive Nos) Tower Place, Malmaison Hotel (Former Sailors' Home)				55°58′40″N 3°10′06″W	Category B	27912	Upload Photo
Botanical Gardens Large Palm House Arboretum Road And Inverleith Row				55°58′01″N 3°12′30″W	Category A	27914	Upload another image See more images
Ratho Village, 49 Main Street And Boundary Wall				55°55′19″N 3°22′46″W	Category C(S)	27741	Upload Photo
44 Chambers Street, The Royal Museum Of Scotland				55°56′49″N 3°11′22″W	Category A	27748	Upload another image
3 West Brighton Crescent				55°57′04″N 3°07′07″W	Category B	27750	Upload Photo
Ratho Village, 54 And 56 (Even Nos) Main Street				55°55′19″N 3°22′48″W	Category C(S)	27774	Upload another image
10 Links Place, The Abbot's House With Boundary Wall And Railings				55°58′23″N 3°09′50″W	Category B	27779	Upload Photo
Canongate, Burgh Cross				55°57′06″N 3°10′45″W	Category B	27796	Upload another image
11, 13 And 14 (Inclusive Nos) Maritime Street				55°58′29″N 3°10′08″W	Category B	27800	Upload Photo
Union Canal, West Hermiston Bridge, Bridge No 12				55°55′07″N 3°19′27″W	Category B	27806	Upload Photo
Union Canal, Gogar Moor Bridge, Bridge No 14				55°55′12″N 3°21′05″W	Category B	27813	Upload Photo
Ratho Mains Farmhouse With Boundary Wall And Steading				55°54′59″N 3°23′01″W	Category B	27657	Upload Photo
9 Rosefield Avenue				55°57′10″N 3°07′00″W	Category B	27658	Upload Photo
13 Rosefield Avenue				55°57′10″N 3°07′01″W	Category B	27666	Upload Photo
5 Rosefield Place				55°57′07″N 3°07′03″W	Category C(S)	27686	Upload Photo
9 Tipperlinn Road With Boundary Walls, Gatepiers And Gates				55°55′50″N 3°12′55″W	Category C(S)	27703	Upload Photo
23 Tipperlinn Road And Morningside Terrace, Royal Edinburgh Hospital, Mackinnon House (Formerly West House) With Boundary Wall To Kinnair Unit (Formerly Sinclair And Erskine Wards)				55°55′38″N 3°12′57″W	Category B	27718	Upload Photo
Newliston House, Bastion And Retaining Walls				55°57′02″N 3°25′41″W	Category B	27583	Upload Photo
Newliston House, Lawn Park Cottage				55°56′37″N 3°25′19″W	Category B	27613	Upload Photo
54 Regent Street				55°57′14″N 3°06′39″W	Category C(S)	27643	Upload Photo
2 Newbattle Terrace, Morningside Parish Church Hall				55°55′50″N 3°12′34″W	Category C(S)	27645	Upload Photo
Off Regent Road, Former Governor's House, Including Curtain Walls				55°57′11″N 3°11′07″W	Category A	27646	Upload another image See more images
Leith Walk, Queen Victoria Statue				55°58′15″N 3°10′18″W	Category B	27654	Upload another image See more images
Kirkliston Village, 1 Manse Road, Former Manse With Gig House And Stables, Gatepiers And Boundary Wall				55°57′20″N 3°24′22″W	Category B	27515	Upload Photo
Kirkliston Village, Newliston Road, Breast Mill (Priest Mill)				55°56′57″N 3°24′22″W	Category C(S)	27519	Upload Photo
51 Promenade, 29 Straiton Place, Including Piers And Terrace Wall				55°57′13″N 3°06′30″W	Category C(S)	27520	Upload Photo
44 Promenade (Formerly At End Of Marlborough Street), Prince Of Wales Fountain				55°57′15″N 3°06′31″W	Category B	27529	Upload another image
3-9 (Odd Nos) Regent Street				55°57′09″N 3°06′44″W	Category C(S)	27534	Upload Photo
1, 3 Morningside Road, Morningside United Church (Former Congregational) With Boundary Walls				55°56′04″N 3°12′34″W	Category B	27541	Upload another image
Kirkliston Village, 19 Station Road				55°57′18″N 3°24′04″W	Category C(S)	27548	Upload Photo

== Key ==
The scheme for classifying buildings in Scotland is:

- Category A: "buildings of national or international importance, either architectural or historic; or fine, little-altered examples of some particular period, style or building type."
- Category B: "buildings of regional or more than local importance; or major examples of some particular period, style or building type, which may have been altered."
- Category C: "buildings of local importance; lesser examples of any period, style, or building type, as originally constructed or moderately altered; and simple traditional buildings which group well with other listed buildings."

In March 2016 there were 47,288 listed buildings in Scotland. Of these, 8% were Category A, and 50% were Category B, with the remaining 42% being Category C.

== See also ==
- List of listed buildings in Edinburgh
