= List of listed buildings in Edinburgh =

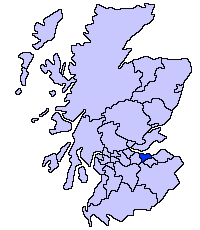
Edinburgh shown within Scotland

This is a list of listed buildings in Edinburgh. The list is split out by parish.

Edinburgh is said to have the largest number of listed buildings of any city in the world.

- List of listed buildings in Currie, Edinburgh
- List of listed buildings in Edinburgh/1
- List of listed buildings in Edinburgh/2
- List of listed buildings in Edinburgh/3
- List of listed buildings in Edinburgh/4
- List of listed buildings in Edinburgh/5
- List of listed buildings in Edinburgh/6
- List of listed buildings in Edinburgh/7
- List of listed buildings in Edinburgh/8
- List of listed buildings in Edinburgh/9
- List of listed buildings in Edinburgh/10
- List of listed buildings in Edinburgh/11
- List of listed buildings in Edinburgh/12
- List of listed buildings in Edinburgh/13
- List of listed buildings in Edinburgh/14
- List of listed buildings in Edinburgh/15
- List of listed buildings in Edinburgh/16
- List of listed buildings in Edinburgh/17
- List of listed buildings in Edinburgh/18
- List of listed buildings in Edinburgh/19
- List of listed buildings in Edinburgh/20
- List of listed buildings in Edinburgh/21
- List of listed buildings in Edinburgh/22
- List of listed buildings in Edinburgh/23
- List of listed buildings in Edinburgh/24
- List of listed buildings in Edinburgh/25
- List of listed buildings in Edinburgh/26
- List of listed buildings in Edinburgh/27
- List of listed buildings in Edinburgh/28
- List of listed buildings in Edinburgh/29
- List of listed buildings in Edinburgh/30
- List of listed buildings in Edinburgh/31
- List of listed buildings in Edinburgh/32
- List of listed buildings in Edinburgh/33

== See also ==
- List of Category A listed buildings in Edinburgh
- Scheduled monuments in Edinburgh
