= List of listed buildings in Edinburgh/11 =

This is a list of listed buildings in Edinburgh, Scotland.

== List ==
Name	Location	Date Listed	Grid Ref. (Note: Sometimes known as OSGB36, the grid reference (where provided) is based on the British national grid reference system used by the Ordnance Survey. • "Guide to National Grid". Ordnance Survey. • "Get-a-map". Ordnance Survey.)	Geo-coordinates	Notes	LB Number (Note: Historic Environment Scotland assign a unique alphanumeric identifier to each designated site in Scotland, for listed buildings this always begins with "LB", for example "LB12345".)	Image
41-53 (Odd Nos) Nile Grove				55°55′36″N 3°12′19″W	Category B	27673	Upload Photo
George Iv Bridge, National Library Of Scotland				55°56′55″N 3°11′31″W	Category B	27684	Upload another image See more images
Ratho Village, Baird Road, Ratho Kirk, St Mary's Church With Session House, Graveyard, Walls And Gatepiers				55°55′28″N 3°22′49″W	Category A	27685	Upload another image See more images
3 And 3A Tipperlinn Road				55°55′53″N 3°12′58″W	Category B	27693	Upload Photo
2-11 Parliament Square, The Supreme Courts Of Scotland				55°56′56″N 3°11′25″W	Category A	27699	Upload another image
11 Rosefield Place				55°57′07″N 3°07′05″W	Category C(S)	27701	Upload Photo
192A High Street, 1 And 1A Parliament Square, Including District Courts (Formerly Police Chambers) And Including Boundary Wall And Railings				55°56′58″N 3°11′23″W	Category A	27714	Upload Photo
15 Johnston Terrace				55°56′53″N 3°11′46″W	Category B	27719	Upload another image
302 Leith Walk				55°57′55″N 3°10′37″W	Category C(S)	27735	Upload Photo
Newliston House, Coach House And Stables And Home Farm				55°56′43″N 3°25′31″W	Category A	27588	Upload Photo
16-20 (Even Nos) Regent Street				55°57′10″N 3°06′45″W	Category C(S)	27589	Upload Photo
120-130 (Even Nos) Morningside Road				55°55′52″N 3°12′37″W	Category B	27607	Upload Photo
Calton Hill, Off Regent Road, Observatory House (Old Observatory), City Observatory				55°57′17″N 3°11′03″W	Category A	27608	Upload another image See more images
28 Regent Street				55°57′11″N 3°06′43″W	Category C(S)	27610	Upload Photo
140 Morningside Road, Old Morningside School, Gospel Hall				55°55′48″N 3°12′36″W	Category B	27612	Upload Photo
30 And 32 Regent Street				55°57′11″N 3°06′43″W	Category C(S)	27614	Upload Photo
184 And 186 Morningside Road, Morningside Public Library				55°55′44″N 3°12′35″W	Category B	27616	Upload Photo
404-420 (Even Nos) Morningside Road				55°55′32″N 3°12′35″W	Category B	27620	Upload Photo
Leith Docks, Martello Tower				55°59′14″N 3°10′25″W	Category B	27625	Upload Photo
50 And 52 Regent Street				55°57′14″N 3°06′40″W	Category C(S)	27638	Upload Photo
West Register Street And Gabriel's Road, New Register House With Boundary Walls, Gatepiers, Gates, Railings And Lamp Standards				55°57′15″N 3°11′25″W	Category A	27641	Upload Photo
Ratho Hall With Walled Garden And Stables				55°55′27″N 3°23′09″W	Category A	27647	Upload Photo
58 Regent Street				55°57′15″N 3°06′38″W	Category C(S)	27648	Upload Photo
Ratho Hall, Garden House (Dovecot)				55°55′26″N 3°23′08″W	Category B	27652	Upload Photo
7 Rosefield Avenue				55°57′11″N 3°07′00″W	Category B	27653	Upload Photo
Kirkliston Village, 36 Main Street				55°57′22″N 3°24′16″W	Category C(S)	27505	Upload Photo
124 Great Junction Street And 13-16(Inclusive Nos) Yardheads (Formerly John Crabbie And Co)				55°58′23″N 3°10′31″W	Category B	27507	Upload Photo
24 Midmar Gardens				55°55′19″N 3°12′08″W	Category C(S)	27513	Upload Photo
16-18 (Inclusive Nos) Promenade				55°57′18″N 3°06′43″W	Category B	27524	Upload Photo
5 Morningside Place And 1B-D Albert Terrace, Strowan Lodge, With Boundary Wall And Gatepiers				55°55′52″N 3°12′41″W	Category B	27526	Upload Photo
Kirkliston Village, 11 Newliston Road, The Manse				55°57′03″N 3°24′21″W	Category B	27528	Upload Photo
2 John's Place				55°58′23″N 3°10′00″W	Category B	27535	Upload Photo
230 Marionville Road, Church Of Ss Ninian And Triduana (Roman Catholic) Including Boundary Walls And Gates				55°57′32″N 3°09′17″W	Category B	27537	Upload Photo
Kirkliston Village, 17 Station Road, Station Cottage				55°57′19″N 3°24′04″W	Category C(S)	27543	Upload Photo
Unit 1, 33 Morningside Road, Church Hill Theatre (Former Morningside Free Church)				55°55′58″N 3°12′35″W	Category B	27546	Upload Photo
Milrig Farm And Farmhouse And Garden Walls				55°56′46″N 3°24′55″W	Category B	27568	Upload Photo
Newliston House With Forecourt And Terrace Walls And Garden Furniture				55°56′48″N 3°25′31″W	Category A	27578	Upload another image
85 And 86 And 2 And 4 Giles Street With Boundary Walls And Gatepiers, Also Known As The Vaults				55°58′26″N 3°10′21″W	Category A	27446	Upload Photo
1-10 (Inclusive Nos) Hermitage Terrace, 1 Cluny Avenue And 2_Nile Grove				55°55′34″N 3°12′30″W	Category B	27454	Upload Photo
13 Jordan Lane With Railings				55°55′38″N 3°12′23″W	Category C(S)	27479	Upload Photo
186 And 188 Portobello High Street				55°57′10″N 3°06′48″W	Category C(S)	27482	Upload Photo
18-46 (Even Nos) Great Junction Street				55°58′17″N 3°10′23″W	Category C(S)	27492	Upload Photo
Heriot-Watt University, Riccarton Estate, Icehouse				55°54′34″N 3°19′18″W	Category C(S)	27362	Upload Photo
106A Constitution Street, St Mary Star Of The Sea, Convent And Presbytery				55°58′24″N 3°10′11″W	Category B	27365	Upload Photo
Shandwick Place St. Georges West Church, (Church Of Scotland)				55°56′58″N 3°12′38″W	Category A	27367	Upload another image
49, 51 (1-3) And 53 Portland Street With Front Walls, Steps And Railings; Eh6 4Az				55°58′36″N 3°10′58″W	Category C(S)	27368	Upload Photo
104 And 106 Even Nos Polwarth Terrace				55°55′48″N 3°13′38″W	Category C(S)	27377	Upload Photo
Hermiston House With West Lodge Gate Towers, Gig-House And Boundary Walls				55°55′04″N 3°19′22″W	Category B	27389	Upload Photo
3-9 Quayside Street, Quayside Mills (Mcgregor & Co) Incorporating Former Manse, Remains Of St Ninian's Church, Tenement, Granary And Mill; Eh6 6Ej				55°58′32″N 3°10′27″W	Category A	27395	Upload Photo
Humbie Cottages				55°57′55″N 3°24′56″W	Category C(S)	27409	Upload Photo
Hermitage Of Braid, Off Braid Road, Ice House				55°55′10″N 3°12′03″W	Category C(S)	27420	Upload another image
8 And 10 South Fort Street With Front Steps And Railings; Eh6 4Dn				55°58′28″N 3°11′01″W	Category B	27421	Upload Photo
Humbie Steading				55°57′53″N 3°25′14″W	Category B	27429	Upload Photo
60 Spylaw Road With Stables				55°55′53″N 3°13′22″W	Category C(S)	27437	Upload Photo
66 Spylaw Road, Redwood, With Conservatory, Greenhouse, Stables And Boundary Walls And Gatepiers				55°55′52″N 3°13′30″W	Category B	27444	Upload Photo
21-29 (Odd Nos) Pitt Street With Railings; Eh6 4By				55°58′24″N 3°11′15″W	Category B	27305	Upload Photo
Gogar Station Road, Millburn Tower With Garden Store, Walled Garden And Gatepiers				55°55′53″N 3°19′40″W	Category B	27306	Upload Photo
68 Constitution Street With Gatepiers And Railings				55°58′27″N 3°10′04″W	Category B	27309	Upload Photo
37A And 39 Marlborough Street				55°57′12″N 3°06′37″W	Category C(S)	27315	Upload Photo
143 Grange Loan, Astley Ainslie Hospital, Sentry Pavilions, Gateposts, Gates And Railings				55°55′52″N 3°11′59″W	Category B	27317	Upload Photo
6-8 (Inclusive Nos) Portland Place And 4 Portland Terrace With Railings; Eh6 6La And Eh6 6Je Respectively				55°58′40″N 3°10′50″W	Category B	27319	Upload another image
78 And 80 Constitution Street				55°58′27″N 3°10′05″W	Category C(S)	27323	Upload Photo
King's Stables Road And Lothian Road, St Cuthbert's Churchyard, Watch Tower				55°56′57″N 3°12′23″W	Category B	27346	Upload another image See more images
North Fort Street, Leith Fort Lodges, Gateway And Boundary Wall				55°58′37″N 3°11′08″W	Category B	27221	Upload another image
19 Merchiston Place				55°56′07″N 3°12′45″W	Category C(S)	27224	Upload Photo
2-6 (Even Nos) North Fort Street And 92, 92A And 94 Ferry Road With Front Walls; Eh6 4Ex And Eh6 4Aq Respectively				55°58′30″N 3°11′01″W	Category C(S)	27228	Upload Photo
7 Glasgow Road, Middle Norton				55°55′43″N 3°22′04″W	Category C(S)	27244	Upload Photo
20-24 (Even Nos) North Fort Street And 6 Madeira Place With Garden Walls; Eh6 4Ad And Eh6 4Aw Respectively				55°58′32″N 3°11′03″W	Category C(S)	27251	Upload Photo
328-332 (Even Nos) Portobello High Street, 1 Pittville Street				55°57′04″N 3°06′27″W	Category C(S)	27253	Upload Photo
149, 149A Constitution Street				55°58′17″N 3°10′12″W	Category B	27256	Upload Photo
26 And 28 (Gf And 1F) North Fort Street With Front Walls; Eh6 4Hd				55°58′33″N 3°11′03″W	Category C(S)	27259	Upload Photo
57 Promenade, Bellfield Street, Portobello Public Swimming Baths, With Stalk And Boundary Walls, Including Post Box				55°57′11″N 3°06′25″W	Category B	27261	Upload another image
30 North Fort Street And 91 To 105 (Odd Nos) Portland Street With Front Walls And Railings; Eh6 4Ad And Eh6 4Ay Respectively				55°58′33″N 3°11′04″W	Category C(S)	27267	Upload Photo
47 Figgate Lane, The Tower				55°57′20″N 3°06′46″W	Category B	27271	Upload another image
25 And 27 North Junction Street, Leith Art College (Former Scandinavian Lutheran Church) With Offices, Gatepiers, Railings And Boundary Walls; Eh6 6Hw				55°58′34″N 3°10′47″W	Category C(S)	27276	Upload Photo
Gogar Station Road, Gogar Bank House With Greenhouse				55°55′28″N 3°19′19″W	Category B	27277	Upload Photo
36-42 (Even Nos) Constitution Street				55°58′30″N 3°10′02″W	Category B	27289	Upload Photo
68 And 68A Madeira Street With Steps And Railings; Eh6 4Au				55°58′36″N 3°10′58″W	Category C(S)	27158	Upload Photo
50 And 52 Brighton Place				55°57′02″N 3°07′06″W	Category B	27163	Upload Photo
3 Merchiston Park				55°56′09″N 3°12′42″W	Category C(S)	27180	Upload Photo
Nicolson Square Methodist Chapel (Methodist) Nicolson Square				55°56′44″N 3°11′10″W	Category A	27185	Upload Photo
Glasgow Road, Norton House Hotel, North Lodge, Gatepiers And Policy Walls				55°56′17″N 3°22′33″W	Category C(S)	27187	Upload Photo
Mansfield Road Harmeny House Lodge, (Originally Stables/Coachhouse) With Gatepiers				55°52′36″N 3°20′10″W	Category B	27190	Upload Photo
39-45 (Odd Nos) Pittville Street (Osbourne Terrace)				55°57′09″N 3°06′23″W	Category C(S)	27197	Upload Photo
120 (1F And 2F) And 122 Newhaven Road With Front Wall And Railings; Eh6 4Br				55°58′25″N 3°11′18″W	Category C(S)	27213	Upload Photo
Glasgow Road, Norton House Hotel, Walled Garden				55°56′00″N 3°23′06″W	Category B	27214	Upload Photo
12 And 14 Pittville Street				55°57′09″N 3°06′20″W	Category C(S)	27215	Upload Photo
1-5 (Inclusive Nos) Madeira Place With Front Walls And Railings; Eh6 4Aw				55°58′33″N 3°11′00″W	Category C(S)	27091	Upload Photo
81, 83 And 85 Milton Road East, Queen's Bay Cottages And Boundary Walls				55°56′42″N 3°05′43″W	Category C(S)	27093	Upload Photo
200 Milton Road East, Portobello Cemetery And Lodge House With Gates, Railings, Gatepiers, Boundary Walls And Pavilion				55°56′41″N 3°05′26″W	Category B	27103	Upload Photo
22 And 24 Brighton Place				55°57′07″N 3°06′58″W	Category B	27107	Upload Photo
29 Madeira Street, Leith Baptist Church With Front Wall And Railings; Eh6 4Aj				55°58′31″N 3°10′56″W	Category C(S)	27111	Upload Photo
201-203 Gilmore Place				55°56′19″N 3°12′50″W	Category C(S)	27114	Upload Photo
1, 1A Cluny Gardens, Red House With Boundary Wall, Gate And Railings				55°55′30″N 3°12′32″W	Category B	27118	Upload Photo
41-47 (Odd Nos) Madeira Street With Front And Garden Walls, Steps And Railings; Eh6 4Aj				55°58′33″N 3°10′57″W	Category C(S)	27128	Upload Photo
38 And 40 Brighton Place				55°57′05″N 3°07′02″W	Category B	27139	Upload Photo
34 Main Street				55°53′01″N 3°20′20″W	Category B	27145	Upload Photo
37-43 (Odd Nos) Constitution Street And 49 Assembly Street, Exchange Buildings				55°58′30″N 3°10′00″W	Category A	27147	Upload Photo
5-25 Odd Nos Lockharton Gardens				55°55′34″N 3°13′52″W	Category C(S)	27152	Upload Photo
Russell Road Railway Bridge With Retaining Walls				55°56′35″N 3°13′46″W	Category B	27019	Upload Photo
Easter Hatton With Boundary Wall And Gates				55°54′24″N 3°22′37″W	Category C(S)	27031	Upload Photo
Easter Hatton Mains, Fairview Cottages And Gates				55°54′24″N 3°22′32″W	Category B	27041	Upload Photo
Foxhall North Lodge				55°57′15″N 3°23′42″W	Category B	27072	Upload Photo
27 Milton Road East, Milton Road East Lodge, Gates And Scaliger Railing				55°56′41″N 3°05′53″W	Category B	27073	Upload Photo
550, Lanark Road West, Northfield With Gardener's Cottage, Garden, Gatepiers And Boundary Wall				55°53′15″N 3°21′00″W	Category B	27076	Upload Photo
4, 5, 5A Cluny Avenue				55°55′32″N 3°12′26″W	Category C(S)	27089	Upload Photo
211 (Gf And 1F) Ferry Road With Boundary Walls; Eh6 4Nn				55°58′24″N 3°11′26″W	Category C(S)	26951	Upload Photo
Dalmahoy Estate, East Gate, Gatepiers And Railings				55°54′51″N 3°20′17″W	Category C(S)	26952	Upload Photo
36 Johnsburn Road Balerno Lodge With Walled Garden, Boundary Wall And Gatepiers				55°52′59″N 3°20′46″W	Category B	26956	Upload Photo
14 And 16 Bellfield Street				55°57′07″N 3°06′31″W	Category B	26957	Upload Photo
15 John Street				55°57′06″N 3°06′15″W	Category B	26965	Upload Photo
1-26 (Inclusive Nos) Richmond Terrace And 51-55 (Odd Nos) Dalry Road With Garden Walls				55°56′40″N 3°13′04″W	Category C(S)	26985	Upload Photo
46 And 48 Bernard Street				55°58′34″N 3°10′08″W	Category B	26993	Upload Photo
Murieston Crescent, Railway Bridge And Associated Quadrant Wall And Gates				55°56′27″N 3°13′41″W	Category C(S)	27008	Upload Photo
73 Restalrig Road With Boundary Wall				55°58′04″N 3°09′28″W	Category C(S)	27013	Upload Photo
24 Bellfield Street				55°57′10″N 3°06′29″W	Category C(S)	27015	Upload Photo
155-195 (Odd Nos) Bruntsfield Place And 1 Bruntsfield Gardens				55°56′08″N 3°12′35″W	Category B	26861	Upload Photo
110-150 Commercial Street, Macdonald And Muir Warehouses Incorporating Cooperage And Walled Yard, Quality House (Queen's Dock), Bond 13, Former Rose's Lime Juice Stores, Boundary Wall And Gatepiers				55°58′42″N 3°10′47″W	Category B	26864	Upload Photo
3-6 (Inclusive Nos) James Street With Boundary Walls				55°57′03″N 3°06′14″W	Category B	26866	Upload Photo
7 And 8 James Street With Boundary Walls				55°57′04″N 3°06′13″W	Category B	26880	Upload Photo
42 And 44 Bath Street				55°57′16″N 3°06′41″W	Category B	26884	Upload Photo
7 Bruntsfield Terrace				55°56′11″N 3°12′22″W	Category B	26887	Upload Photo
1A And 2-11 (Inclusive Nos) Dock Place; Eh6 6Lu				55°58′38″N 3°10′19″W	Category B	26890	Upload Photo
9 And 10 James Street With Boundary Walls				55°57′04″N 3°06′13″W	Category C(S)	26892	Upload Photo
Haymarket Terrace, Haymarket Inn				55°56′45″N 3°13′06″W	Category C(S)	26913	Upload Photo
12-18 (Even Nos) Bernard Street				55°58′33″N 3°10′02″W	Category B	26922	Upload Photo
Johnsburn Road, Larch Grove With Stables And Gatepiers				55°52′56″N 3°21′05″W	Category B	26932	Upload Photo
8 Bellfield Street				55°57′06″N 3°06′32″W	Category C(S)	26933	Upload Photo
19 Smith's Place With Kitchen Garden, Walls, Gates And Gatepiers				55°58′01″N 3°10′23″W	Category A	26934	Upload another image
157 And 159 Colinton Road				55°55′31″N 3°14′02″W	Category B	26815	Upload Photo
Distillery Lane Easter Dalry House And Boundary Wall				55°56′42″N 3°13′08″W	Category B	26824	Upload Photo
72-98 (Inclusive Nos) Commercial Street, (Incorporates Bond 42 And 63/1X2 And 64/1, 2, Gf And 1F), And 13-15 (Inclusive Nos) Dock Place With Gatepiers And Railings; Eh6 6Nf, 6Lx And 6Jd				55°58′38″N 3°10′26″W	Category A	26825	Upload another image
Bonnington House With Balustraded Wall				55°54′24″N 3°25′23″W	Category A	26826	Upload Photo
6 And 8 Gorgie Road, Royal Bank Of Scotland				55°56′21″N 3°13′37″W	Category C(S)	26837	Upload Photo
18 And 20 Bath Street				55°57′14″N 3°06′45″W	Category B	26844	Upload Photo
131-151 (Odd Nos) Bruntsfield Place, 42 Forbes Road And 2 Bruntsfield Gardens				55°56′11″N 3°12′29″W	Category B	26848	Upload Photo
22 And 24 Bath Street				55°57′15″N 3°06′45″W	Category C(S)	26858	Upload Photo
Almondhill Steading				55°57′36″N 3°23′42″W	Category B	26748	Upload Photo
17, Bridge Road, Deanpark Primary School, School Master's House With Boundary Walls				55°53′06″N 3°20′24″W	Category C(S)	26752	Upload Photo
11 Bath Street				55°57′11″N 3°06′48″W	Category B	26753	Upload Photo
Dalry Road, Dalry Primary School With Caretaker's Lodge, Boundary Walls And Gatepiers				55°56′32″N 3°13′22″W	Category C(S)	26759	Upload Photo
33 And 35 Bellfield Street				55°57′09″N 3°06′27″W	Category B	26762	Upload Photo
410 And 412 Easter Road And Lochend Road, Leith St Andrew's Church Of Scotland And Church Hall				55°58′07″N 3°10′02″W	Category B	26767	Upload Photo
208-210 Even Nos Bruntsfield Place And 2 And 4 Merchiston Place				55°56′08″N 3°12′37″W	Category B	26777	Upload Photo
Buteland Farm				55°52′00″N 3°22′55″W	Category B	26779	Upload Photo
39-77 Odd Nos Slateford Road 2 Merchiston Grove 3-7 Odd Nos Shandon Place				55°56′06″N 3°13′53″W	Category C(S)	26782	Upload Photo
39-47 (Odd Nos) Bellfield Street (Vernon Villas)				55°57′10″N 3°06′26″W	Category C(S)	26789	Upload Photo
55-59 Leith Walk, Tsb And 61 Leith Walk And Crown Street, Bank Of Scotland				55°58′10″N 3°10′21″W	Category C(S)	26794	Upload Photo
5-13A (Odd Nos) Academy Street With Railings				55°58′14″N 3°10′14″W	Category B	26705	Upload Photo
4 Claremont Park With Boundary Walls, Gatepiers And Lamp Brackets				55°58′11″N 3°09′27″W	Category B	26713	Upload Photo

== Key ==
The scheme for classifying buildings in Scotland is:

- Category A: "buildings of national or international importance, either architectural or historic; or fine, little-altered examples of some particular period, style or building type."
- Category B: "buildings of regional or more than local importance; or major examples of some particular period, style or building type, which may have been altered."
- Category C: "buildings of local importance; lesser examples of any period, style, or building type, as originally constructed or moderately altered; and simple traditional buildings which group well with other listed buildings."

In March 2016 there were 47,288 listed buildings in Scotland. Of these, 8% were Category A, and 50% were Category B, with the remaining 42% being Category C.

== See also ==
- List of listed buildings in Edinburgh
