= List of listed buildings in Edinburgh/14 =

This is a list of listed buildings in Edinburgh, Scotland.

== List ==
Name	Location	Date Listed	Grid Ref. (Note: Sometimes known as OSGB36, the grid reference (where provided) is based on the British national grid reference system used by the Ordnance Survey. • "Guide to National Grid". Ordnance Survey. • "Get-a-map". Ordnance Survey.)	Geo-coordinates	Notes	LB Number (Note: Historic Environment Scotland assign a unique alphanumeric identifier to each designated site in Scotland, for listed buildings this always begins with "LB", for example "LB12345".)	Image
100-104 (Even Nos) Rose Street				55°57′08″N 3°11′58″W	Category B	29646	Upload another image
144-150 (Even Nos) Rose Street, Debenhams				55°57′07″N 3°12′07″W	Category C(S)	29650	Upload Photo
32 And 33 Queen Street With Railings				55°57′16″N 3°12′01″W	Category A	29550	Upload Photo
34 Queen Street With Railings				55°57′16″N 3°12′01″W	Category A	29551	Upload Photo
74-77 (Inclusive) Queen Street				55°57′11″N 3°12′23″W	Category A	29571	Upload Photo
Raeburn Place, 44, 46				55°57′34″N 3°12′44″W	Category B	29589	Upload Photo
1 Ramsay Lane, Former Ragged School With Gate				55°56′57″N 3°11′45″W	Category B	29596	Upload another image
30, 32, 34 Palmerston Place, Palmerston Court, Including Railings				55°56′55″N 3°13′04″W	Category B	29476	Upload Photo
36-48 (Even Nos) Palmerston Place, Including Railings				55°56′55″N 3°13′05″W	Category B	29477	Upload Photo
23 Pentland Avenue, Colinton Cottage, With Boundary Wall				55°54′26″N 3°15′54″W	Category B	29482	Upload Photo
4 Pier Place Including Barometer				55°58′50″N 3°11′44″W	Category B	29491	Upload Photo
30 Princes Street And South St Andrew's Street, Formerly Forsyth's				55°57′11″N 3°11′31″W	Category A	29503	Upload another image
131-133 (Inclusive Nos) Princes Street				55°57′03″N 3°12′19″W	Category B	29518	Upload Photo
2, 2A And 3 Queen Street And 12 North St David Street, Scottish Life, With Railings And Lamps				55°57′19″N 3°11′42″W	Category C(S)	29530	Upload Photo
4-6 (Inclusive Nos) Queen Street, Bbc Scotland (Known As No 5)				55°57′18″N 3°11′44″W	Category A	29532	Upload Photo
7 Queen Street				55°57′18″N 3°11′46″W	Category B	29534	Upload Photo
21 Queen Street With Railings				55°57′17″N 3°11′55″W	Category A	29543	Upload Photo
28-30A (Even Nos) Northumberland Street, Including Railings And Lamps				55°57′25″N 3°11′55″W	Category A	29456	Upload another image
Old Church Lane, Home House, Duddingston				55°56′31″N 3°08′46″W	Category B	29462	Upload Photo
Oxford Terrace, 2-12 (Including Odd Nos)				55°57′20″N 3°12′57″W	Category A	29471	Upload Photo
4-10 (Even Nos) Palmerston Place, Including Railings				55°56′50″N 3°12′57″W	Category B	29474	Upload Photo
186 Newhaven Road, St Clair's, Including Coach House, Gatepiers And Boundary Wall				55°58′38″N 3°11′32″W	Category B	29398	Upload Photo
208 Newhaven Road Including Boundary Wall And Gatepier				55°58′42″N 3°11′34″W	Category B	29401	Upload Photo
1, 2 And 3 Nicolson Square And 43 And 45 Nicolson Street				55°56′47″N 3°11′08″W	Category B	29411	Upload Photo
8-16 (Even Nos) Nicolson Street				55°56′49″N 3°11′08″W	Category B	29417	Upload Photo
22-26 (Even Nos) Nicolson Street				55°56′47″N 3°11′06″W	Category C(S)	29419	Upload Photo
112A Nicolson Street, Haddon's Court				55°56′40″N 3°10′59″W	Category B	29428	Upload Photo
Nicolson Street West 3-9				55°56′42″N 3°11′05″W	Category B	29432	Upload Photo
49 Minto Street, Including Boundary Wall And Pedestrian Gates				55°56′12″N 3°10′40″W	Category B	29363	Upload another image
25-27 (Odd Numbers) Montrose Terrace				55°57′26″N 3°10′17″W	Category B	29367	Upload Photo
79-83 (Odd Nos) Morrison Street				55°56′44″N 3°12′34″W	Category C(S)	29372	Upload Photo
Melville Crescent, 4-6 And 43 Melville Street And 19 Walker Street				55°57′00″N 3°12′49″W	Category A	29320	Upload Photo
10, 11, 12 Melville Crescent, 44 Melville Street And, Walker Street Including Railings And Arched Lamp Holders				55°56′57″N 3°12′50″W	Category A	29322	Upload Photo
46-60 (Even Numbers) Melville Street, 31 Manor Place, Including Railings And Arched Lamp Holders				55°56′57″N 3°12′52″W	Category A	29328	Upload another image
5 Minto Street, Including Boundary Walls, Piers And Carriage Gate				55°56′12″N 3°10′37″W	Category C(S)	29340	Upload Photo
2 Malta Terrace And 7 St Bernard's Row				55°57′34″N 3°12′36″W	Category B	29294	Upload Photo
48, 50, 52, 54, 56, 58 Manor Place, 12 Rothesay Place				55°57′00″N 3°13′03″W	Category B	29301	Upload Photo
Marchhall Crescent, Abden House Including Gatepiers And Boundary Walls				55°56′14″N 3°10′11″W	Category B	29303	Upload another image
Mary's Place 2				55°57′32″N 3°12′49″W	Category B	29306	Upload Photo
5 South Maybury, Maybury Roadhouse				55°57′33″N 3°18′52″W	Category B	29309	Upload Photo
1-11 (Inclusive Nos) Leopold Place And 2-4 (Even Nos) Windsor Street Including Railings				55°57′29″N 3°11′02″W	Category A	29257	Upload another image
57-65 (Odd Nos) Lothian Road				55°56′52″N 3°12′21″W	Category B	29265	Upload another image
86, 88 And 90 Kirkbrae, The Liberton Inn				55°54′49″N 3°09′37″W	Category C(S)	29202	Upload Photo
20 Laverockbank Road, Woodville, With Boundary Walls And Gatepiers				55°58′37″N 3°12′06″W	Category B	29226	Upload Photo
Lawnmarket, Lady Stair's Close, Lady Stair's House				55°56′59″N 3°11′37″W	Category A	29231	Upload another image See more images
497-499 Lawnmarket And 7 And 11 James Court				55°56′58″N 3°11′39″W	Category B	29235	Upload Photo
11, 12 And 13 North Bank Street And 8 James Court				55°56′59″N 3°11′38″W	Category A	29236	Upload Photo
312-320 (Even Nos) Lawnmarket, Including Fisher's Close				55°56′57″N 3°11′37″W	Category A	29240	Upload Photo
322-328 (Even Nos) Lawnmarket, Including Riddles Court, Riddles Close And 5 And 6 Victoria Terrace				55°56′56″N 3°11′37″W	Category A	29242	Upload another image
332-340 (Even Nos) Lawnmarket				55°56′57″N 3°11′39″W	Category B	29244	Upload Photo
5-9A (Odd Nos) India Street, Including Railings And Lamps				55°57′19″N 3°12′18″W	Category A	29127	Upload Photo
4-10 (Even Nos) India Street, Including Railings And Lamps				55°57′18″N 3°12′21″W	Category A	29131	Upload Photo
2 Gloucester Place And 46-52 (Even Nos) India Street, Including Railings And Lamps				55°57′25″N 3°12′24″W	Category A	29142	Upload Photo
Inverleith Gardens 22, 23				55°58′15″N 3°12′42″W	Category C(S)	29146	Upload Photo
Inverleith Row 9 And 10				55°57′55″N 3°12′13″W	Category B	29158	Upload Photo
Inverleith Row, 13 And 14				55°57′56″N 3°12′15″W	Category B	29160	Upload Photo
Inverleith Row, 18				55°57′59″N 3°12′17″W	Category B	29164	Upload Photo
Inverleith Row, 40 And 41				55°58′09″N 3°12′27″W	Category B	29176	Upload Photo
3-37 (Odd Nos) Jeffrey Street, Including Boundary Wall To Rear				55°57′03″N 3°11′05″W	Category B	29189	Upload Photo
55-61 (Odd Nos) Jeffrey Street				55°57′04″N 3°11′13″W	Category C(S)	29191	Upload Photo
16 Johnston Terrace And 3 Castle Wynd North				55°56′55″N 3°11′46″W	Category B	29194	Upload another image
17, 19 And 19A Hill Street, Edinburgh Lodge No 1				55°57′13″N 3°12′10″W	Category A	29081	Upload Photo
31-37 (Odd Nos) Howe Street, Including Railings				55°57′25″N 3°12′08″W	Category A	29114	Upload Photo
12-16 (Even Nos) Howe Street, Including Railings				55°57′21″N 3°12′09″W	Category B	29116	Upload Photo
24 Howe Street, Including Railings And Mews				55°57′23″N 3°12′10″W	Category B	29118	Upload Photo
43-47 (Inclusive Nos) Heriot Row, And 2 And 2A India Street, Including Railings And Lamps				55°57′18″N 3°12′20″W	Category A	29027	Upload Photo
7, 9 And 11 High Street				55°57′03″N 3°11′05″W	Category B	29032	Upload Photo
133 And 135 High Street, Including Range To Rear And 4 Carrubber's Close				55°57′02″N 3°11′13″W	Category B	29044	Upload another image
215-219 (Odd Nos) High Street				55°57′01″N 3°11′20″W	Category A	29047	Upload Photo
16 High Street				55°57′02″N 3°11′05″W	Category B	29060	Upload another image
19-25 (Odd Nos) Grove Street, Including Railings				55°56′44″N 3°12′45″W	Category B	28979	Upload Photo
2 Grove Street And 181 Morrison Street, Including Railings				55°56′46″N 3°12′48″W	Category B	28980	Upload Photo
2 Mcdonald Road Library Including Nelson Hall				55°57′41″N 3°10′53″W	Category B	28986	Upload Photo
101-109 (Odd Nos) Hanover Street With Railings				55°57′17″N 3°11′51″W	Category B	29003	Upload Photo
20 And 22 Hanover Street With Railings, Incorporating The Merchants Hall And 39 Rose Street South Lane				55°57′10″N 3°11′50″W	Category B	29006	Upload another image
34-52 (Even Nos) Hanover Street With Railings				55°57′11″N 3°11′50″W	Category B	29008	Upload Photo
84-90 (Even Nos) Hanover Street And 18-24 (Even Nos) Thistle Street				55°57′15″N 3°11′52″W	Category B	29012	Upload Photo
7-19 (Odd Nos) Great Stuart Street, Including Railings				55°57′10″N 3°12′40″W	Category A	28967	Upload Photo
8-10 (Even Nos) Gloucester Street & 4 India Place, Duncan's Land				55°57′26″N 3°12′28″W	Category B	28927	Upload Photo
1 Grant Avenue With Gate				55°56′25″N 3°12′31″W	Category B	28928	Upload Photo
30-40 (Even Nos) Grassmarket, Including White Hart Inn				55°56′51″N 3°11′49″W	Category B	28938	Upload another image
22 Upper Gray Street, Including Boundary Wall				55°56′10″N 3°10′44″W	Category B	28958	Upload Photo
77 And 79 George Street				55°57′11″N 3°12′05″W	Category B	28845	Upload Photo
91 And 91A George Street With Railings And Lamp Standards				55°57′10″N 3°12′08″W	Category A	28847	Upload Photo
97-105 (Odd Nos) George Street, Bank Of Scotland				55°57′10″N 3°12′10″W	Category A	28850	Upload Photo
125 George Street With Railings And Lamp Standards				55°57′09″N 3°12′19″W	Category A	28856	Upload Photo
34-38 (Even Nos) And 38A George Street				55°57′11″N 3°11′52″W	Category B	28867	Upload Photo
44, 46 And 46A George Street With Railings And Lamp Standards				55°57′11″N 3°11′53″W	Category B	28868	Upload Photo
72-76 (Even Nos), And 72A George Street And 34 Frederick Street With Railings				55°57′10″N 3°12′03″W	Category B	28874	Upload Photo
106-110 (Even Nos) George Street And 32A Castle Street				55°57′08″N 3°12′14″W	Category B	28881	Upload Photo
46-55 George Iv Bridge, 69-71 Cowgate And 7 Merchant Street				55°56′53″N 3°11′30″W	Category C(S)	28893	Upload Photo
Gillespie Road, 39 Colinton				55°54′28″N 3°16′21″W	Category C(S)	28896	Upload Photo
90-98 (Even Nos) Fountainbridge, Scottish Midland Co-Operative Society, Formerly St Cuthbert's Co-Operative Association, Including Boundary Walls				55°56′37″N 3°12′29″W	Category B	28777	Upload another image
21-25 (Odd Nos) Frederick Street				55°57′09″N 3°11′59″W	Category B	28782	Upload another image
12-16 (Even Nos) Frederick Street				55°57′07″N 3°12′01″W	Category B	28789	Upload Photo
1-5 (Inclusive Nos) Gayfield Place And 33-33A Gayfield Square Including Railings				55°57′32″N 3°11′04″W	Category A	28798	Upload another image
6 And 6A Gayfield Square Including Railings And Boundary Wall				55°57′33″N 3°11′11″W	Category B	28802	Upload Photo
7 And 7A Gayfield Square Including Railings And Garden Wall				55°57′34″N 3°11′12″W	Category B	28803	Upload Photo
12-17A (Inclusive Nos) Gayfield Square Including Railings				55°57′35″N 3°11′08″W	Category A	28805	Upload Photo
George Square 22				55°56′37″N 3°11′26″W	Category A	28814	Upload another image
George Square 24				55°56′36″N 3°11′26″W	Category A	28817	Upload another image
19-25 (Odd Nos) George Street, George Hotel				55°57′14″N 3°11′48″W	Category A	28830	Upload Photo
47 George Street And 25A South West Thistle Street Lane				55°57′14″N 3°11′56″W	Category B	28837	Upload Photo
63 George Street				55°57′12″N 3°11′59″W	Category B	28841	Upload Photo
1-23 (Inclusive Nos) Elm Row And 2 Montgomery Street				55°57′30″N 3°11′01″W	Category A	28734	Upload another image
43 Inverleith Gardens				55°58′14″N 3°12′52″W	Category C(S)	28742	Upload Photo
122 Ferry Road, Baynefield House				55°58′29″N 3°11′06″W	Category B	28744	Upload Photo
2-10 (Even Nos) Forres Street, Including Railings				55°57′13″N 3°12′29″W	Category A	28769	Upload Photo
1, 3 And 5 Forrest Road				55°56′47″N 3°11′28″W	Category B	28770	Upload another image
1-13 (Inclusive Numbers) Drumsheugh Place				55°57′05″N 3°12′44″W	Category B	28678	Upload Photo
11 Dublin Street, Including Railings				55°57′22″N 3°11′34″W	Category B	28679	Upload Photo
21 And 21A Dublin Street, Including Railings				55°57′24″N 3°11′35″W	Category B	28683	Upload Photo
48-60 (Even Nos) Dublin Street, Including Railings				55°57′28″N 3°11′40″W	Category B	28695	Upload Photo
9-13C (Odd Nos) Dundas Street, Including Railings				55°57′23″N 3°11′55″W	Category B	28703	Upload Photo
53-65 (Odd Nos) Dundas Street, Including Railings				55°57′30″N 3°11′58″W	Category A	28709	Upload Photo
4-10 (Even Nos) Dundas Street, Including Railings And Lamps				55°57′23″N 3°11′57″W	Category B	28713	Upload Photo
18-20 (Even Nos) Dundas Street, And 36 Northumberland Street, Including Railings				55°57′24″N 3°11′57″W	Category B	28715	Upload Photo
56-66A (Even Nos) Dundas Street, Including Railings				55°57′29″N 3°12′00″W	Category B	28719	Upload Photo
68-76 (Even Nos) Dundas Street And 39-41 (Odd Nos) Cumberland Street, Including Railings				55°57′30″N 3°12′01″W	Category A	28720	Upload Photo
78-86A (Even Nos) Dundas Street, And 36A Cumberland Street, Including Railings				55°57′31″N 3°12′02″W	Category A	28721	Upload Photo
5 Dell Road, St Cuthbert's Manse				55°54′33″N 3°15′20″W	Category B	28652	Upload Photo
14-21 (Inclusive Nos) Douglas Crescent, Including Railings				55°56′58″N 3°13′17″W	Category B	28655	Upload Photo
94-114 Cowgate, Library For Solicitors In The Supreme Courts Of Scotland				55°56′55″N 3°11′26″W	Category A	28600	Upload another image See more images
36-62B (Even Nos) Cumberland Streetand 1, 2, 4, 6, 7, 7 A And 8, North West Cumberland Street Lane, Including Railings				55°57′31″N 3°12′05″W	Category A	28614	Upload Photo
Dalkeith Road, Salisbury Green Including Boundary Walls				55°56′17″N 3°10′17″W	Category A	28620	Upload Photo
2-12 (Even Nos) Darnaway Street, Including Railings And Lamps, With 8-10 (Inclusive Nos) Wemyss Place Mews				55°57′16″N 3°12′23″W	Category A	28633	Upload Photo
Dean Street 1-9				55°57′31″N 3°12′38″W	Category B	28639	Upload Photo
26-30 (Even Nos) Cockburn Street				55°57′01″N 3°11′23″W	Category B	28578	Upload Photo
5 And 7 Corstorphine High Street Including Boundary Walls, Gatepiers And Gates				55°56′26″N 3°16′58″W	Category B	28591	Upload Photo
Clarence Street 1 And 109-119 Henderson Row				55°57′35″N 3°12′21″W	Category B	28536	Upload Photo
Clarence Street 4-20A				55°57′34″N 3°12′23″W	Category B	28540	Upload Photo
22-26 Clarence Street, Even Numbers				55°57′32″N 3°12′21″W	Category C(S)	28541	Upload Photo
Clerk Street 20-44 & 2-6 Rankeillor Street				55°56′33″N 3°10′56″W	Category B	28548	Upload Photo
Clerk Street South 43-47				55°56′25″N 3°10′48″W	Category B	28552	Upload another image
Clerk Street South 86-94				55°56′22″N 3°10′48″W	Category B	28558	Upload Photo
Clerk Street South 96-102				55°56′21″N 3°10′48″W	Category B	28559	Upload Photo
354 Castlehill And 17 Johnston Terrace, Former Castlehill School With Janitor's House, Ancillary Buildings, Railings And Retaining Wall				55°56′55″N 3°11′46″W	Category B	28490	Upload another image
Causeway, The Lochside Cottage Duddingston				55°56′31″N 3°08′56″W	Category B	28496	Upload Photo
4-12 Chapel Street				55°56′41″N 3°11′09″W	Category B	28499	Upload Photo
24-32 (Inclusive Nos) Charlotte Square, 13-19 (Odd Nos) Hope Street And 14 And 16 South Charlotte Street With Railings, Lamp Standards And Boundary Walls				55°57′03″N 3°12′29″W	Category A	28505	Upload another image
33-39 (Inclusive Nos) Charlotte Square And 142-146 George Street With Railings And Lamp Standards				55°57′05″N 3°12′22″W	Category A	28506	Upload another image
12 South Charlotte Street With Railings				55°57′04″N 3°12′24″W	Category A	28516	Upload another image
11-22 (Inclusive Nos) North West Circus Place, Including Railings				55°57′27″N 3°12′24″W	Category B	28521	Upload Photo
25-29 Inclusive Nos) North West Circus Place, And 2 Gloucester Street				55°57′26″N 3°12′28″W	Category B	28523	Upload Photo
189 Canongate And 191 (Flats 2, 4 And 6) Canongate				55°57′05″N 3°10′52″W	Category B	28435	Upload Photo
265 And 267 Canongate, Morocco Land				55°57′03″N 3°11′00″W	Category B	28438	Upload Photo
124 Canongate				55°57′05″N 3°10′44″W	Category B	28443	Upload another image
142 And 146 Canongate, Huntly House (Museum Of Edinburgh)				55°57′05″N 3°10′46″W	Category A	28445	Upload another image
154-166 (Even Nos) Canongate				55°57′05″N 3°10′47″W	Category B	28447	Upload another image
194-198 (Even Nos) Canongate, Old Playhouse Close				55°57′03″N 3°10′55″W	Category B	28452	Upload another image

== Key ==
The scheme for classifying buildings in Scotland is:

- Category A: "buildings of national or international importance, either architectural or historic; or fine, little-altered examples of some particular period, style or building type."
- Category B: "buildings of regional or more than local importance; or major examples of some particular period, style or building type, which may have been altered."
- Category C: "buildings of local importance; lesser examples of any period, style, or building type, as originally constructed or moderately altered; and simple traditional buildings which group well with other listed buildings."

In March 2016 there were 47,288 listed buildings in Scotland. Of these, 8% were Category A, and 50% were Category B, with the remaining 42% being Category C.

== See also ==
- List of listed buildings in Edinburgh
