= List of listed buildings in Edinburgh/18 =

This is a list of listed buildings in Edinburgh, Scotland.

== List ==
Name	Location	Date Listed	Grid Ref. (Note: Sometimes known as OSGB36, the grid reference (where provided) is based on the British national grid reference system used by the Ordnance Survey. • "Guide to National Grid". Ordnance Survey. • "Get-a-map". Ordnance Survey.)	Geo-coordinates	Notes	LB Number (Note: Historic Environment Scotland assign a unique alphanumeric identifier to each designated site in Scotland, for listed buildings this always begins with "LB", for example "LB12345".)	Image
Former James Clark School, 1-9 (Inclusive Nos) St Leonard's Crag (Note Modern Additions Of 1961 In Court And Annexe On St Leonard's Hill Are Excluded)				55°56′39″N 3°10′40″W	Category B	30046	Upload Photo
1 West Coates, Including Boundary Walls And Obelisk				55°56′46″N 3°13′40″W	Category C(S)	29917	Upload Photo
2 Woodhall Road, The Old Schoolhouse, With Steps, Railings And Retaining Wall				55°54′26″N 3°15′23″W	Category C(S)	29953	Upload Photo
Wardie Road, 1 Inverleith				55°58′16″N 3°12′43″W	Category C(S)	29892	Upload Photo
Summerhall Place, 1-15, 1-2 West Preston Street And 1 Summerhall Square				55°56′22″N 3°10′55″W	Category B	29834	Upload another image See more images
33 Thistle Street				55°57′15″N 3°11′59″W	Category B	29838	Upload Photo
16-20 (Inclusive Nos) Trinity Crescent, With Boundary Wall And Railings				55°58′47″N 3°12′16″W	Category B	29854	Upload Photo
11-15 (Odd Nos) Victoria Street				55°56′55″N 3°11′36″W	Category C(S)	29877	Upload Photo
16-18A (Even Nos) Scotland Streetand 24 West Scotland Street Lane, Including Railings				55°57′35″N 3°11′43″W	Category B	29782	Upload Photo
7-9 (Inclusive Nos) South Bridge And 9-13 Niddry Street				55°56′59″N 3°11′14″W	Category C(S)	29789	Upload Photo
35 Spylaw Street				55°54′28″N 3°15′27″W	Category C(S)	29824	Upload Photo
St Patrick Square 22 And 1-5 Clerk Street				55°56′34″N 3°10′59″W	Category B	29735	Upload Photo
7 And 9 St Patrick Street				55°56′37″N 3°11′00″W	Category C(S)	29742	Upload Photo
21 And 21A Salisbury Road, Southwick House, Including Boundary Walls, Gatepiers And Pedestrian Gate				55°56′18″N 3°10′31″W	Category B	29754	Upload Photo
10 Salisbury Road, Including Boundary Walls, Gatepiers And Pedestrian Gate				55°56′15″N 3°10′36″W	Category B	29761	Upload Photo
2-4 (Inclusive Nos) Rutland Square, Including Railings And Lamp Standard				55°56′56″N 3°12′30″W	Category A	29687	Upload another image
8 And 10 South St Andrew Street				55°57′12″N 3°11′31″W	Category B	29710	Upload Photo
St Bernard's Crescent 1 And 12 Leslie Place				55°57′28″N 3°12′41″W	Category B	29711	Upload Photo
St Bernard's Crescent 2 And 18 Carlton Street				55°57′26″N 3°12′41″W	Category A	29713	Upload Photo
St. Bernard's Crescent, 14 And 36 And 38 Danube Street				55°57′26″N 3°12′46″W	Category A	29716	Upload Photo
9-11 St Bernard's Row				55°57′35″N 3°12′37″W	Category B	29719	Upload Photo
St Bernard's Row 20				55°57′35″N 3°12′40″W	Category B	29722	Upload Photo
17, 18 Rothesay Place				55°57′00″N 3°13′06″W	Category B	29666	Upload Photo
10-13 (Inclusive Nos) Randolph Place				55°57′05″N 3°12′36″W	Category B	29603	Upload Photo
28 Redford Road, Sherwood, With Gatepiers, Boundary Wall And Railings				55°54′25″N 3°14′55″W	Category B	29615	Upload Photo
202 Rose Street And 150 Rose Street South Lane				55°57′04″N 3°12′19″W	Category B	29655	Upload another image
39 And 39A Queen Street And 64 And 66 Frederick Street With Railings				55°57′15″N 3°12′05″W	Category A	29554	Upload Photo
40-42 (Inclusive), With 40A And 42A, Queen Street With Railings				55°57′15″N 3°12′06″W	Category A	29555	Upload Photo
54 Queen Street With Railings				55°57′14″N 3°12′12″W	Category A	29562	Upload Photo
55-57 (Inclusive Nos) Queen Street With Railings And Lamp Standards				55°57′14″N 3°12′13″W	Category A	29563	Upload Photo
21 Pentland Avenue, The Rowans With Boundary Wall				55°54′27″N 3°15′50″W	Category B	29481	Upload Photo
46 And 48 Pilrig Street And Boundary Walls				55°57′54″N 3°10′49″W	Category B	29496	Upload Photo
61-2 Princes Street, Romanes And Paterson				55°57′10″N 3°11′43″W	Category A	29506	Upload Photo
99B, 100 And 100A Princes Street, Incorporating Royal Overseas House				55°57′06″N 3°12′01″W	Category B	29510	Upload another image
104 And 105 Princes Street				55°57′06″N 3°12′03″W	Category B	29511	Upload Photo
Nicolson Street West, 34 And 36				55°56′40″N 3°11′07″W	Category B	29440	Upload Photo
63 And 65 Northumberland Street, Including Railings And Lamp				55°57′24″N 3°12′06″W	Category A	29452	Upload Photo
Old Church Lane, 12, Duddingston Lodge, Duddingston				55°56′30″N 3°08′50″W	Category B	29465	Upload Photo
Old Church Lane, 16, Dunerne, Duddingston				55°56′30″N 3°08′52″W	Category B	29467	Upload Photo
27, 29, 31, 33, 35, 37, 39 Palmerston Place, Including Railings				55°56′58″N 3°13′06″W	Category B	29473	Upload Photo
16 And 18 Nelson Street, And 2, And 4 Northumberland Street, Including Railings And Lamps				55°57′26″N 3°11′49″W	Category A	29391	Upload Photo
172 And 174 Newhaven Road Including Gatepiers And Boundary Walls				55°58′36″N 3°11′30″W	Category B	29395	Upload Photo
37 And 38 Minto Street, Including Boundary Walls And Pedestrian Gates				55°56′07″N 3°10′35″W	Category B	29358	Upload Photo
85-89 (Odd Nos) Morrison Street				55°56′44″N 3°12′35″W	Category B	29373	Upload Photo
1 Mound Place, Patrick Geddes Hall (Part)				55°56′59″N 3°11′45″W	Category A	29379	Upload another image
1-3 (Inclusive Nos) Middlefield And 15 Spey Street And Boundary Walls And Gatepier				55°57′48″N 3°10′46″W	Category A	29335	Upload Photo
37 And 39 Newhaven Main Street, Including Iron Railings And Boundary Walls				55°58′49″N 3°11′51″W	Category C(S)	29288	Upload Photo
15-30 (Inclusive Nos) West Maitland Street				55°56′49″N 3°12′57″W	Category B	29292	Upload Photo
5-11 (Odd Nos) Leith Street				55°57′14″N 3°11′17″W	Category B	29249	Upload Photo
17-25 (Odd Nos) Leith Street				55°57′14″N 3°11′16″W	Category B	29251	Upload Photo
71 And 73 Lothian Road And 44-48 (Even Nos) Grindlay Street				55°56′48″N 3°12′19″W	Category C(S)	29266	Upload Photo
75-83 (Odd Nos) Lothian Road				55°56′48″N 3°12′20″W	Category C(S)	29267	Upload Photo
16 And 18 Lauriston Place, Including Boundary Wall Gate And Railings				55°56′42″N 3°11′45″W	Category B	29218	Upload another image
4-8 (Inclusive Numbers) Learmonth Terrace, Including Boundary Walls And Railings				55°57′20″N 3°13′03″W	Category B	29246	Upload another image
25 Learmonth Terrace, Learmonth House				55°57′20″N 3°13′15″W	Category A	29248	Upload Photo
20-24 (Even Nos) India Street, Including Railings And Lamps				55°57′20″N 3°12′22″W	Category A	29136	Upload Photo
36-42 (Even Nos) India Street, Including Railings And Lamps				55°57′22″N 3°12′23″W	Category A	29140	Upload Photo
Inverleith Place 13-19				55°58′05″N 3°12′28″W	Category C(S)	29148	Upload Photo
Inverleith Row, 5 And 6				55°57′53″N 3°12′11″W	Category A	29155	Upload Photo
Inverleith Row, 17				55°57′58″N 3°12′16″W	Category B	29163	Upload Photo
Inverleith Row, 19 And 19A				55°57′59″N 3°12′17″W	Category B	29165	Upload Photo
Inverleith Row 30, 31				55°58′05″N 3°12′23″W	Category C(S)	29172	Upload Photo
Inverleith Row 35				55°58′06″N 3°12′24″W	Category C(S)	29173	Upload Photo
Inverleith Row, 38, 39 And 39A				55°58′08″N 3°12′26″W	Category B	29175	Upload Photo
4-18 (Even Nos) Jeffrey Street And 3-9 (Odd Nos) Cranston Street				55°57′03″N 3°11′03″W	Category B	29192	Upload Photo
1-4 (Inclusive Nos) Howard Place And 51 And 53 Warriston Crescent, With Railings And Elevation Of Northern Bar				55°57′49″N 3°12′03″W	Category B	29102	Upload Photo
25-29 (Odd Nos) Howe Street, Including Railings				55°57′24″N 3°12′08″W	Category A	29113	Upload Photo
18-22 (Even Nos) Howe Street				55°57′22″N 3°12′09″W	Category B	29117	Upload Photo
1-5 (Odd Nos) High Street And 1 Jeffrey Street				55°57′03″N 3°11′04″W	Category B	29031	Upload Photo
137-141 (Odd Nos) High Street And 29-31 North Bridge, Royal Bank Building				55°57′01″N 3°11′14″W	Category B	29037	Upload another image
127 And 129 High Street				55°57′02″N 3°11′13″W	Category B	29043	Upload another image
233-243 (Odd Nos) High Street				55°57′00″N 3°11′22″W	Category A	29049	Upload Photo
343-363 (Odd Nos) High Street And 2-8 (Even Nos) Advocate's Close				55°56′59″N 3°11′29″W	Category A	29050	Upload Photo
14 High Street, 'sedan Chair House'				55°57′01″N 3°11′05″W	Category B	29059	Upload Photo
146-154 (Even Nos) High Street				55°56′59″N 3°11′20″W	Category B	29070	Upload Photo
172 High Street, Old Assembly Close, The Mackenzie Building (Former George Heriots Hospital School)				55°56′58″N 3°11′21″W	Category B	29073	Upload Photo
1-8 (Inclusive Nos) Haddington Place Including Railings				55°57′34″N 3°11′02″W	Category A	28983	Upload another image
28-32A (Inclusive Nos) Haddington Place With 30 And 32 Annandale Street Lane				55°57′38″N 3°10′56″W	Category A	28985	Upload another image
Hamilton Place 70-88				55°57′34″N 3°12′24″W	Category B	28996	Upload Photo
35-43 (Odd Nos) Hanover Street And 25-27 (Odd Nos) Rose Street With Railings And Lamp Standards				55°57′11″N 3°11′48″W	Category B	28998	Upload Photo
104-112 (Even Nos) Hanover Street And 4 North West Thistle Street Lane				55°57′16″N 3°11′54″W	Category B	29014	Upload Photo
7-13 (Odd Nos) Hart Street				55°57′30″N 3°11′16″W	Category B	29016	Upload Photo
2,4,12, And 14 Hart Street				55°57′30″N 3°11′18″W	Category B	29017	Upload Photo
Henderson Row 32-42A And 1, 1A Perth Street				55°57′38″N 3°12′12″W	Category B	29022	Upload Photo
1-4 (Inclusive Nos) Granton Square, Including Railings				55°58′52″N 3°13′30″W	Category B	28930	Upload Photo
70 And 72 Grassmarket				55°56′52″N 3°11′44″W	Category B	28941	Upload another image
5 South Gray Street, Including Boundary Walls, Gatepiers And Pedestrian Gates				55°56′04″N 3°10′38″W	Category B	28945	Upload Photo
131, 133 And 133A George Street				55°57′08″N 3°12′21″W	Category B	28858	Upload Photo
56 And 58 George Street With Railings				55°57′11″N 3°11′57″W	Category A	28870	Upload Photo
126 And 128 George Street				55°57′06″N 3°12′18″W	Category B	28886	Upload Photo
5-15 (Odd Nos) Gilmore Place Including Boundary Walls				55°56′30″N 3°12′14″W	Category B	28902	Upload Photo
26 And 28 Gilmore Place, Including Boundary Wall And Railings				55°56′30″N 3°12′24″W	Category B	28913	Upload Photo
17 And 19 Frederick Street And 104A Rose Street				55°57′08″N 3°11′58″W	Category B	28781	Upload another image
18 And 18A Frederick Street And 106 Rose Street				55°57′08″N 3°12′01″W	Category B	28790	Upload Photo
58-62 (Even Nos) And 62A Frederick Street With Railings And Lamp Standards				55°57′14″N 3°12′05″W	Category A	28796	Upload Photo
1 And 3 Gayfield Square And 1 Gayfield Close Including Boundary Wall, Gatepiers And Railings				55°57′32″N 3°11′09″W	Category B	28799	Upload Photo
37-39 (Odd Nos) Broughton Place And 1 And 2 Gayfield Street				55°57′32″N 3°11′14″W	Category B	28808	Upload Photo
45 Inverleith Gardens				55°58′14″N 3°12′53″W	Category B	28743	Upload Photo
150 Ferry Road Including Boundary Wall				55°58′28″N 3°11′13″W	Category B	28747	Upload Photo
40 Newhaven Main Street				55°58′50″N 3°11′41″W	Category B	28767	Upload Photo
35-49 (Odd Nos) Dublin Street, Including Railings				55°57′26″N 3°11′36″W	Category B	28684	Upload Photo
51-59 (Odd Nos) Dublin Street, Including Railings				55°57′27″N 3°11′36″W	Category B	28685	Upload Photo
12-16A (Even Nos) Dublin Street, Including Railings				55°57′23″N 3°11′37″W	Category B	28690	Upload Photo
62 Dublin Street, Including Railings				55°57′28″N 3°11′40″W	Category B	28696	Upload Photo
19 And 21 Dundas Street, And 32-34 (Even Nos) Northumberland Street, Including Railings				55°57′24″N 3°11′55″W	Category B	28705	Upload another image
Deanhaugh Street 12-36 And 1 And 1A Leslie Place				55°57′30″N 3°12′35″W	Category A	28651	Upload Photo
78 Craighall Road Including Gatepiers				55°58′27″N 3°11′46″W	Category B	28601	Upload Photo
7-33 (Odd Nos) Cumberland Street, Including Railings				55°57′32″N 3°11′52″W	Category B	28605	Upload Photo
43-57 (Odd Nos) Cumberland Street, Including Railings				55°57′30″N 3°12′03″W	Category B	28610	Upload Photo
75-79 (Odd Nos) Cumberland Street				55°57′29″N 3°12′09″W	Category B	28612	Upload Photo
66 Dalkeith Road, Including Boundary Walls				55°56′15″N 3°10′19″W	Category C(S)	28624	Upload Photo
122 Dalkeith Road, Mayfield Terrace Lodge And Gatepiers				55°56′08″N 3°10′10″W	Category B	28628	Upload Photo
1-7 (Inclusive Numbers) Coates Place, 1 Palmerston Place, 2 Manor Place, Including Railings				55°56′51″N 3°12′54″W	Category C(S)	28568	Upload Photo
1 Cockburn Street, With Railings				55°57′03″N 3°11′27″W	Category B	28569	Upload another image
23 Cockburn Street				55°57′03″N 3°11′25″W	Category B	28575	Upload Photo
102 Corstorphine Road, Beechmount House, Including Coach House, Gate Lodge, Boundary Wall, Gatepiers And Lamp Columns				55°56′43″N 3°15′30″W	Category B	28589	Upload Photo
Clerk Street South 31-41				55°56′27″N 3°10′50″W	Category C(S)	28551	Upload Photo
549 Castlehill, Outlook Tower				55°57′00″N 3°11′38″W	Category A	28488	Upload another image
195 And 197 Canongate, Shoemakers Land				55°57′04″N 3°10′53″W	Category B	28437	Upload another image
246-248 (Even Nos) Canongate				55°57′02″N 3°10′59″W	Category B	28455	Upload Photo
Carlton Street 15 And 15, 15A (Whalen Only) Leslie Place				55°57′27″N 3°12′40″W	Category B	28458	Upload Photo
10, 10A-14 (Even Nos) Castle Street With Railings				55°57′05″N 3°12′12″W	Category B	28471	Upload Photo
30 And 32 Castle Street With Railing				55°57′07″N 3°12′13″W	Category B	28475	Upload Photo
1 And 2 Castle Terrace And 11-17 (Odd Nos) Lothian Road, Including Boundary Wall And Railings				55°56′55″N 3°12′22″W	Category B	28480	Upload Photo
5-7 (Inclusive Nos) Castle Terrace, Including Boundary Wall And Railings				55°56′55″N 3°12′21″W	Category B	28482	Upload Photo
Buccleuch Place 7				55°56′34″N 3°11′09″W	Category B	28382	Upload Photo
Buccleuch Place 8				55°56′34″N 3°11′10″W	Category B	28383	Upload Photo
Buccleuch Place 14-16				55°56′33″N 3°11′13″W	Category B	28386	Upload Photo
Canon Street 9, 10				55°57′44″N 3°11′56″W	Category C(S)	28424	Upload Photo
Canon Street 11				55°57′44″N 3°11′56″W	Category C(S)	28425	Upload Photo
3 Canongate, Russell House				55°57′10″N 3°10′30″W	Category A	28426	Upload another image
26 And 28 Blacket Place, Including Boundary Walls				55°56′13″N 3°10′32″W	Category B	28315	Upload Photo
2 Bonaly Road With Retaining Wall And Gate				55°54′15″N 3°15′42″W	Category C(S)	28333	Upload Photo
42 Bridge Road With Gate				55°54′26″N 3°15′25″W	Category C(S)	28349	Upload Photo
44 And 46 Bridge Road With Gate And Boundary Wall				55°54′26″N 3°15′26″W	Category C(S)	28350	Upload Photo
3 And 5 East Broughton Place Including Boundary Wall And Railings				55°57′31″N 3°11′14″W	Category B	28357	Upload Photo
10-12 (Even Nos) Broughton Street, Including Railings				55°57′25″N 3°11′18″W	Category A	28366	Upload Photo
The Vennel, 1 And 3 Brown's Place With Retaining Wall, Railings And Gate				55°56′48″N 3°11′50″W	Category B	28369	Upload another image
54-58 (Even Nos) Montgomery Street And 23 Brunswick Street				55°57′33″N 3°10′47″W	Category C(S)	28372	Upload Photo
7-11 (Odd Nos) Bellevue Place Including Boundary Walls And Railings				55°57′38″N 3°11′31″W	Category B	28288	Upload Photo
15 Blacket Place, Including Boundary Walls				55°56′10″N 3°10′26″W	Category B	28302	Upload Photo
Ann Street 45-47				55°57′21″N 3°12′45″W	Category A	28244	Upload another image
Ann Street 44				55°57′22″N 3°12′44″W	Category A	28248	Upload Photo
1-3 (Odd Nos) Annandale Street Including Railings				55°57′34″N 3°11′02″W	Category A	28252	Upload Photo
1-6 (Inclusive Nos) Antigua Street And 1-3 (Odd Numbers) Union Street Including Railings And Garden Wall				55°57′28″N 3°11′07″W	Category B	28257	Upload Photo
7 Redhall House Drive, Redhall House				55°55′06″N 3°15′05″W	Category B	28117	Upload Photo
68 Roseburn Street, Roseburn House, Including Boundary Walls And Gatepiers				55°56′35″N 3°14′13″W	Category A	28120	Upload Photo
Colinton Road, Merchiston Castle School, Dovecot				55°54′31″N 3°15′13″W	Category B	28133	Upload Photo
Redhall House - Dovecote Craiglockhart Drive South				55°55′11″N 3°14′56″W	Category A	28145	Upload Photo
Howdenhall Road, St Catherine's Outbuildings And Walled Garden				55°54′10″N 3°09′44″W	Category B	28146	Upload Photo

== Key ==
The scheme for classifying buildings in Scotland is:

- Category A: "buildings of national or international importance, either architectural or historic; or fine, little-altered examples of some particular period, style or building type."
- Category B: "buildings of regional or more than local importance; or major examples of some particular period, style or building type, which may have been altered."
- Category C: "buildings of local importance; lesser examples of any period, style, or building type, as originally constructed or moderately altered; and simple traditional buildings which group well with other listed buildings."

In March 2016 there were 47,288 listed buildings in Scotland. Of these, 8% were Category A, and 50% were Category B, with the remaining 42% being Category C.

== See also ==
- List of listed buildings in Edinburgh
