= List of listed buildings in Edinburgh/24 =

This is a list of listed buildings in Edinburgh, Scotland.

== List ==
Name	Location	Date listed	Grid ref. (Note: Sometimes known as OSGB36, the grid reference (where provided) is based on the British national grid reference system used by the Ordnance Survey. • "Guide to National Grid". Ordnance Survey. • "Get-a-map". Ordnance Survey.)	Geo-coordinates	Notes	LB number (Note: Historic Environment Scotland assign a unique alphanumeric identifier to each designated site in Scotland, for listed buildings this always begins with "LB", for example "LB12345".)	Image
15-18 Teviot Place				55°56′44″N 3°11′26″W	Category C(S)	48251	Upload Photo
57 Dreghorn Loan, Dunalistair House Lodge				55°54′13″N 3°15′05″W	Category C(S)	48535	Upload Photo
42 Murrayfield Road, Glion And Crossways				55°56′59″N 3°14′58″W	Category C(S)	48901	Upload Photo
Ravelston Dykes Road, Mary Erskine School (Former Ravelston House), Ice House				55°57′12″N 3°15′18″W	Category C(S)	48903	Upload Photo
87 Ravelston Dykes Road, Wall Incorporating Old Fireplace (1 Of 2) And Ice House Entrance				55°57′07″N 3°15′19″W	Category B	48907	Upload Photo
Roseburn Terrace, Roseburn New Bridge				55°56′45″N 3°14′10″W	Category C(S)	48913	Upload Photo
1 Roseburn Terrace And Roseburn Street, Roseburn Bar, The Flyhalf				55°56′43″N 3°14′02″W	Category C(S)	48914	Upload Photo
9 Succoth Gardens				55°57′01″N 3°14′18″W	Category B	48915	Upload Photo
5-8 (Inclusive Numbers) Piershill Place				55°57′18″N 3°08′52″W	Category B	49045	Upload Photo
168 Easter Road, St Margaret's Episcopal Church Including School, Boundary Wall And Railings				55°57′39″N 3°10′16″W	Category C(S)	49056	Upload Photo
124 And 126 Willowbrae Road With Boundary Wall, Railings And Gates				55°57′08″N 3°08′43″W	Category C(S)	49062	Upload Photo
St Giles Street, K6 Telephone Kiosk				55°57′01″N 3°11′32″W	Category B	49068	Upload another image
11-17 (Odd Nos) Annandale Street Including Railings				55°57′35″N 3°11′03″W	Category A	49144	Upload Photo
11 And 13 Union Street Including Railings And Boundary Wall				55°57′29″N 3°11′09″W	Category B	49152	Upload Photo
Holyrood Park, Duddingston (South) Lodge, 32, Old Church Lane				55°56′31″N 3°09′00″W	Category B	49511	Upload Photo
1 Craigend Park, Kingston Lodge With Boundary Wall And Gatepiers				55°55′05″N 3°09′13″W	Category C(S)	49540	Upload Photo
11 Kinnear Road, Scott House And Boundary Wall				55°58′04″N 3°13′03″W	Category B	49542	Upload Photo
25 Bridge Road, Railings And Gates				55°54′26″N 3°15′33″W	Category A	49552	Upload Photo
2A Thorburn Road, Bonaly Primary School Annex With Outbuildings And Boundary Wall				55°54′27″N 3°15′09″W	Category C(S)	49572	Upload Photo
Fettes College, Sundial				55°57′50″N 3°13′39″W	Category A	49628	Upload Photo
7 Regent Terrace Including Railings And Boundary Walls				55°57′16″N 3°10′39″W	Category A	49770	Upload Photo
14 Regent Terrace, Including Railings And Boundary Walls				55°57′17″N 3°10′36″W	Category A	49777	Upload another image
19 Regent Terrace Including Railings And Boundary Walls				55°57′18″N 3°10′34″W	Category A	49782	Upload another image
22 Regent Terrace Including Railings And Boundary Walls				55°57′19″N 3°10′33″W	Category A	49785	Upload another image
69-74 (Inclusive Nos) Bruntsfield Place, Bruntsfield Hotel With Boundary Wall				55°56′17″N 3°12′21″W	Category C(S)	49834	Upload Photo
11 Succoth Avenue				55°56′59″N 3°14′23″W	Category B	49837	Upload Photo
Chalmer's Close, (Between High Street And Jeffrey Street), Trinity College Church Apse, Including Carved Stone Fragments And Boundary Walls				55°57′04″N 3°11′08″W	Category A	25747	Upload Photo
30 George Square, University Of Edinburgh, Main Library				55°56′34″N 3°11′20″W	Category A	50191	Upload another image
48A The Pleasance, University Of Edinburgh, Examination Hall, (Former Free Church)				55°56′52″N 3°10′55″W	Category C(S)	50199	Upload Photo
12 Cramond Road North, Avisfield With Garden Walls And Terraces				55°58′27″N 3°17′24″W	Category B	50793	Upload Photo
13 Croft-An-Righ, St Anne's Yard (Former Brewery Buildings)				55°57′17″N 3°10′17″W	Category B	51175	Upload another image
78 And 78A Inverleith Place				55°57′56″N 3°13′08″W	Category C(S)	51317	Upload Photo
94 Inverleith Place				55°57′54″N 3°13′16″W	Category C(S)	51318	Upload Photo
3 Miller Row, Riverside Works, (Former Squash Court)				55°57′10″N 3°12′53″W	Category B	51339	Upload Photo
25 Palmerston Place				55°56′58″N 3°13′05″W	Category B	51340	Upload another image
83/85 Boswall Parkway, St Margaret Mary's Roman Catholic Church				55°58′33″N 3°13′57″W	Category B	45647	Upload Photo
Granton Harbour, Sea Wall And Embankment To East Of Mid Pier				55°59′10″N 3°13′26″W	Category C(S)	45651	Upload Photo
159 Lower Granton Road, Former Stables, Including Gatepiers And Boundary Wall				55°58′50″N 3°13′23″W	Category B	45656	Upload Photo
Dundas Castle, Boat House				55°58′09″N 3°24′50″W	Category B	45471	Upload Photo
Baberton House, Bothy				55°54′33″N 3°17′48″W	Category C(S)	45414	Upload Photo
Dalmeny House, Gardener's Cottage, Including Boundary Wall				55°59′15″N 3°20′30″W	Category C(S)	45437	Upload Photo
7 Gillespie Street, The City Of Edinburgh Council Darroch Education Centre, Former James Gillespie's High School Annexe, Including Boundary Walls, Gates, Gatepiers And Railings				55°56′26″N 3°12′26″W	Category C(S)	44934	Upload Photo
63 Gilmore Place, Gilmore Place Free Presbyterian Church Including Boundary Walls, Gates And Gatepiers				55°56′28″N 3°12′30″W	Category B	44938	Upload Photo
42-46 (Even Nos) Leamington Terrace Including Boundary Walls, Gates And Railings				55°56′21″N 3°12′30″W	Category C(S)	44941	Upload Photo
134 Corstorphine Road, Edinburgh Zoo (Royal Zoological Society Of Scotland) West Lodge Complex				55°56′42″N 3°16′18″W	Category C(S)	44751	Upload Photo
18 And 20 St John's Road Including Boundary Walls				55°56′33″N 3°16′36″W	Category C(S)	44755	Upload Photo
49 Marine Drive With Boundary Walls And Courtyard Setts				55°58′34″N 3°16′18″W	Category B	44620	Upload Photo
75 Restalrig Road South, Including Boundary Walls And Railings				55°57′32″N 3°08′59″W	Category C(S)	44628	Upload Photo
32 Charterhall Road				55°55′33″N 3°11′21″W	Category B	44206	Upload Photo
64 Dalkeith Road, Including Pedestrian Gates And Boundary Walls				55°56′15″N 3°10′20″W	Category C(S)	44212	Upload Photo
10 And 10A Gordon Terrace, Cademuir, Including Gates, Gatepiers And Boundary Walls				55°55′25″N 3°10′05″W	Category B	44219	Upload Photo
8 And 10 Granby Road, Including Boundary Walls				55°55′40″N 3°10′22″W	Category C(S)	44222	Upload Photo
Mayfield Road And West Mains Road, University Of Edinburgh, King's Buildings, Mechanical Engineering				55°55′23″N 3°10′19″W	Category B	44229	Upload Photo
2 2A And 4 Mayfield Terrace, Including Boundary Walls				55°56′04″N 3°10′24″W	Category C(S)	44234	Upload Photo
2 Queens Crescent, Including Boundary Walls				55°56′01″N 3°10′20″W	Category C(S)	44251	Upload Photo
8 And 10 Grove Street, Including Railings				55°56′44″N 3°12′47″W	Category B	44036	Upload Photo
10 Barnton Avenue West, The Shaws, Including Gatepiers				55°58′03″N 3°18′09″W	Category B	43931	Upload Photo
37, Cammo Road, Cammo Home Farm Including Boundary Wall And Gatepier				55°57′37″N 3°19′11″W	Category C(S)	43935	Upload Photo
85 Craighall Road, Station, Including Bridge				55°58′35″N 3°11′48″W	Category C(S)	43689	Upload Photo
24-36 (Even Nos) Craighall Road				55°58′38″N 3°11′51″W	Category C(S)	43690	Upload Photo
17-27 (Odd Nos) East Trinity Road Including Boundary Walls And Gatepiers				55°58′38″N 3°11′55″W	Category B	43691	Upload Photo
4 And 5 Fishmarket Square				55°58′50″N 3°11′42″W	Category C(S)	43694	Upload Photo
5 And 6 Great Michael Close				55°58′50″N 3°11′37″W	Category C(S)	43698	Upload Photo
4 And 5 Lamb's Court				55°58′50″N 3°11′43″W	Category C(S)	43703	Upload Photo
4 And 6 Newhaven Main Street, Victoria Primary School				55°58′50″N 3°11′34″W	Category B	43704	Upload Photo
212 And 214 Newhaven Road, Including Gatepiers And Boundary Walls				55°58′42″N 3°11′35″W	Category B	43716	Upload Photo
234 And 236 Newhaven Road				55°58′44″N 3°11′35″W	Category C(S)	43718	Upload Photo
11 Pier Place				55°58′50″N 3°11′49″W	Category C(S)	43725	Upload Photo
London Road And 1A-1 Easter Road, Church Of Scotland Church, Church Hall, Offices And Boundary Walls				55°57′29″N 3°10′20″W	Category B	43494	Upload Photo
1A Hill Street				55°57′13″N 3°12′05″W	Category B	43295	Upload Photo
7-11 (Odd Nos) Hope Street				55°57′03″N 3°12′28″W	Category B	43308	Upload Photo
32 North West Thistle Street Lane				55°57′15″N 3°12′01″W	Category C(S)	43309	Upload Photo
34 North West Thistle Street Lane				55°57′15″N 3°12′01″W	Category C(S)	43310	Upload Photo
79 And 79A Princes Street				55°57′08″N 3°11′50″W	Category C(S)	43321	Upload Photo
121-122 Princes Street				55°57′04″N 3°12′14″W	Category B	43327	Upload Photo
34 And 36 Rose Street North Lane				55°57′11″N 3°11′53″W	Category C(S)	43344	Upload Photo
17 Thistle Street				55°57′16″N 3°11′48″W	Category B	43352	Upload Photo
19 Thistle Street				55°57′16″N 3°11′48″W	Category C(S)	43353	Upload Photo
Liberton Gardens, Alnwickhill Reservoir With Boundary Walls				55°54′31″N 3°09′58″W	Category B	43246	Upload Photo
Liberton Gardens, Bank Of Scotland				55°54′44″N 3°09′49″W	Category C(S)	43248	Upload Photo
Gilmerton, 2 Drum Street, Faith Mission And Bible College With Boundary Wall				55°54′24″N 3°08′06″W	Category B	43254	Upload Photo
114 And 116 George Street With Railings And Lamp Standards				55°57′08″N 3°12′16″W	Category C(S)	43290	Upload Photo
11-19 (Odd Nos) Hanover Street				55°57′09″N 3°11′47″W	Category C(S)	43292	Upload Photo
21-27 (Odd Nos) Hanover Street				55°57′10″N 3°11′47″W	Category B	43293	Upload Photo
3 Marchhall Crescent, Marchhall Nursing Home Including Boundary Walls And Gatepiers				55°56′13″N 3°10′08″W	Category B	43155	Upload Photo
4 Salisbury Road, Synagogue Chambers Including Gatepiers And Boundary Walls				55°56′17″N 3°10′30″W	Category B	43172	Upload another image
35, 37 And 39 Upper Gray Street, Including Boundary Walls And Pedestrian Gate				55°56′09″N 3°10′41″W	Category B	43174	Upload Photo
35 And 35B High Street, Clydesdale Bank				55°59′24″N 3°23′42″W	Category C(S)	40382	Upload Photo
36 High Street, The Ferry Tap Ale House, And 1-3 (Inclusive Nos) Forth Court At Rear				55°59′23″N 3°23′42″W	Category B	40385	Upload Photo
Hopetoun Road, The Priory Church Of St. Mary Of Mount Carmel, Including Boundary Walls				55°59′27″N 3°23′54″W	Category A	40391	Upload another image
5 Mid Terrace And 1 And 2 Hamilton's Close				55°59′24″N 3°23′45″W	Category B	40397	Upload Photo
3 The Vennel, Old Parish Church				55°59′22″N 3°23′42″W	Category B	40404	Upload Photo
15 West Terrace				55°59′24″N 3°23′47″W	Category C(S)	40408	Upload Photo
17 West Terrace, Rosebery Memorial Hall				55°59′25″N 3°23′49″W	Category B	40410	Upload another image
1 East Terrace				55°59′23″N 3°23′34″W	Category C(S)	40337	Upload Photo
2 East Terrace, St. Annes				55°59′23″N 3°23′35″W	Category B	40338	Upload Photo
7 Edinburgh Road				55°59′24″N 3°23′33″W	Category C(S)	40360	Upload Photo
4 Edinburgh Road To 9 East Terrace, Wall And Railings				55°59′23″N 3°23′35″W	Category B	40369	Upload Photo
11-13 (Odd Nos) Spottiswoode Street				55°56′19″N 3°11′54″W	Category B	30597	Upload Photo
Thirlestane Road Warrender Baths				55°56′07″N 3°11′51″W	Category B	30607	Upload Photo
1-2 Warrender Park Crescent & 10-11 Alvanley Terrace Including Walls				55°56′17″N 3°12′11″W	Category B	30608	Upload Photo
3-5 (Inclusive Nos) Warrender Park Crescent Incl Railings				55°56′17″N 3°12′09″W	Category B	30609	Upload Photo
29-33 (Odd Nos) Warrender Park Road				55°56′18″N 3°11′39″W	Category B	30616	Upload another image
57-59 (Odd Nos) Warrender Park Road				55°56′19″N 3°11′47″W	Category B	30622	Upload Photo
97-101 (Odd Nos) Warrender Park Road				55°56′18″N 3°11′56″W	Category B	30630	Upload Photo
147-151 (Odd Nos) Warrender Park Road				55°56′15″N 3°12′08″W	Category B	30640	Upload Photo
5-7 (Incl Nos) Warrender Park Terrace Including Railings				55°56′21″N 3°11′46″W	Category B	30646	Upload another image
14-16 (Incl Nos) Warrender Park Terrace Incl Railings				55°56′21″N 3°11′49″W	Category B	30649	Upload another image
36 And 37 Warrender Park Terrace				55°56′20″N 3°11′59″W	Category C(S)	30658	Upload another image
40 And 41 Warrender Park Terrace				55°56′20″N 3°12′01″W	Category C(S)	30660	Upload another image
115 Whitehouse Loan Gillis College The Hermitage				55°56′05″N 3°11′59″W	Category B	30666	Upload Photo
117 Grange Loan				55°55′51″N 3°11′25″W	Category C(S)	30505	Upload Photo
2 Greenhill Gardens Incl Gatepiers & Boundary Walls				55°56′11″N 3°12′18″W	Category B	30511	Upload Photo
4 Greenhill Gardens				55°56′10″N 3°12′19″W	Category C(S)	30512	Upload Photo
41 Marchmont Crescent				55°56′14″N 3°11′37″W	Category B	30536	Upload Photo
25 Marchmont Road				55°56′19″N 3°11′41″W	Category B	30544	Upload Photo
49-53 (Odd Nos) Marchmont Road				55°56′15″N 3°11′39″W	Category B	30547	Upload Photo
4-8 (Even Nos) Marchmont Road				55°56′21″N 3°11′44″W	Category B	30552	Upload Photo
14 And 16 Marchmont Road				55°56′20″N 3°11′44″W	Category B	30554	Upload Photo
40-44 (Even Nos) Marchmont Road				55°56′17″N 3°11′43″W	Category C(S)	30558	Upload Photo
112-116 (Even Nos) Marchmont Road				55°56′09″N 3°11′41″W	Category B	30563	Upload Photo
6-8 (Inclusive Nos) Marchmont Street				55°56′18″N 3°12′00″W	Category B	30572	Upload Photo
8 And 8B Mortonhall Road Including Gatepiers And Boundary Walls				55°55′41″N 3°11′25″W	Category B	30581	Upload Photo
24 Mortonhall Road				55°55′40″N 3°11′39″W	Category C(S)	30583	Upload Photo
Observatory Road, Harrison Arch				55°55′29″N 3°10′54″W	Category B	30584	Upload another image See more images
15, 17 And 19 (Formerly 1A, 1B And 1C) Oswald Road, Including Gatepiers And Boundary Walls				55°55′47″N 3°11′30″W	Category B	30585	Upload Photo
2 & 2A Clinton Rd Avallon Including Lodge, Gates Gatepiers And Boundary Walls				55°55′55″N 3°12′05″W	Category A	30501	Upload Photo
36-40 (Even Nos) Grange Loan And 54 Findhorn Place Including Boundary Walls And Pedestrian Gateway				55°56′02″N 3°10′46″W	Category B	30383	Upload another image
Grange Road And Chalmers Crescent, St Catherine's Argyle Church Including Gatepiers				55°56′09″N 3°11′25″W	Category C(S)	30386	Upload Photo
15, 15A, 17 And 17A Grange Road				55°56′13″N 3°10′58″W	Category B	30389	Upload another image
15 And 17 Hatton Place				55°56′16″N 3°11′17″W	Category C(S)	30399	Upload Photo
31 Mansionhouse Road				55°56′06″N 3°11′20″W	Category B	30424	Upload Photo
80-84 (Even Nos) Marchmont Crescent				55°56′11″N 3°11′37″W	Category B	30440	Upload another image
101-103 (Odd Nos) Marchmont Road				55°56′08″N 3°11′38″W	Category B	30446	Upload another image
3 Chalmers Crescent				55°56′14″N 3°11′30″W	Category B	30345	Upload Photo
3A Chalmers Crescent, Croston Lodge Nursing Home				55°56′14″N 3°11′30″W	Category B	30346	Upload Photo
2 Dick Place, Including Boundary Walls				55°56′04″N 3°10′53″W	Category B	30357	Upload another image
38 Dick Place, Stables, Including Boundary Wall				55°55′59″N 3°11′17″W	Category B	30364	Upload Photo
38 Findhorn Place Including Boundary Walls, Gatepiers And Pedestrian Gateway				55°56′05″N 3°10′50″W	Category B	30370	Upload another image
61-65 (Odd Nos) Fountainhall Road Including Boundary Walls				55°55′49″N 3°11′08″W	Category B	30375	Upload Photo
George Street, At St Andrew Square, Pair Of K6 Telephone Kiosks				55°57′14″N 3°11′40″W	Category B	30248	Upload Photo
High Street, Chalmer's Close, K6 Telephone Kiosks				55°57′02″N 3°11′08″W	Category B	30255	Upload another image
30 Corstorphine Road, Tor Nursing Home, Including Gate Lodge, Gatepiers, Railings And Boundary Walls				55°56′44″N 3°14′49″W	Category B	30256	Upload Photo
14 Cramond Road North, Lindores, Including Boundary Wall, Gatepiers And Gates				55°58′27″N 3°17′26″W	Category C(S)	30269	Upload Photo
Waverley Station				55°57′07″N 3°11′24″W	Category A	30270	Upload Photo
20, 21, 22 Damside, Including Outbuilding				55°57′08″N 3°13′06″W	Category C(S)	30277	Upload Photo
11 New Market Road, Corn Exchange				55°55′38″N 3°14′54″W	Category B	30282	Upload Photo
Roseburn Terrace, Former Railway Bridge				55°56′44″N 3°13′55″W	Category B	30287	Upload another image
32 Canonmills				55°57′45″N 3°11′57″W	Category C(S)	30288	Upload Photo
1-6 (Inclusive Nos) Market Street, City Art Centre				55°57′03″N 3°11′21″W	Category A	30139	Upload Photo

== Key ==
The scheme for classifying buildings in Scotland is:

- Category A: "buildings of national or international importance, either architectural or historic; or fine, little-altered examples of some particular period, style or building type."
- Category B: "buildings of regional or more than local importance; or major examples of some particular period, style or building type, which may have been altered."
- Category C: "buildings of local importance; lesser examples of any period, style, or building type, as originally constructed or moderately altered; and simple traditional buildings which group well with other listed buildings."

In March 2016 there were 47,288 listed buildings in Scotland. Of these, 8% were Category A, and 50% were Category B, with the remaining 42% being Category C.

== See also ==
- List of listed buildings in Edinburgh
