= John Wilson =

John Wilson may refer to:

== Academics ==
- John Wilson (agriculturalist) (1812–1888), British agriculturalist
- John Matthias Wilson (1814–1881), Oxford college head, clergyman and philosopher
- John Wilson (Scottish mathematician) (1847−1896), Scottish mathematician and physicist
- John Cook Wilson (1849–1915), English philosopher
- John Hardie Wilson (1858−1920), Scottish botanist
- J. Dover Wilson (John Dover Wilson, 1881–1969), British professor and scholar of Renaissance literature
- John Wilson (industrial chemist) (1890–1976), British chemist
- John Wilson (Egyptologist) (1899–1976), American Egyptologist
- John Long Wilson (1914–2001), American medical professor and university administrator
- John T. Wilson (1914–1990), president of the University of Chicago, 1975–1978
- John Wilson (philosopher, born 1928) (1928–2003), British philosopher of education
- John Stuart Wilson (born 1944), British mathematician
- John Silvanus Wilson, American academic administrator, president of Morehouse College
- John Wilson (public policy expert), professor of public policy and management at Glasgow Caledonian University

== Architecture and engineering ==
- John Wilson (English architect) (1781–1866), British Board of Ordnance clerk of works and architect in Guernsey
- John A. Wilson (topographical engineer) (1789–1833), American chief engineer on the Columbia and Philadelphia Railroad
- John William Wilson (architect) (1829–1915), architect in Rockhampton, Queensland, Australia
- John Moulder Wilson (1837–1919), Union and U.S. Army engineer
- John Appleton Wilson (1851–1927), American architect
- John Wilson (Scottish architect) (1877−1959), hospital architect and author
- John Armistead Wilson (1879–1954), Scottish-born Canadian engineer and aviation pioneer
- John Tuzo Wilson (1908–1993), Canadian geophysicist

== Entertainment ==
=== Art ===
- John Wilson (painter, born 1774) (1774–1855), Scottish painter
- John James Wilson (1818–1875), painter, son of John Wilson
- John A. Wilson (sculptor) (1877–1954), Canadian sculptor in Nova Scotia
- John David Wilson (1919–2013), English artist, animator and producer
- John Woodrow Wilson (1922–2015), American lithographer, sculptor and art teacher

=== Film ===
- John Wilson (filmmaker) (born 1986), American documentary filmmaker

=== Music ===
- John Wilson (composer) (1595–1674), English composer and lutenist
- John Wilson (singer) (1800–1849), Scottish tenor
- John Wilson (drummer) (born 1947), drummer from Northern Ireland
- Willie Wilson (drummer) (John Andrew Wilson, born 1947), English drummer, member of Quiver
- Back Alley John (John Carl David Wilson, 1955–2006), Canadian blues singer, songwriter and harmonica player
- John Wilson (conductor) (born 1972), British orchestral conductor

=== Writing ===
- John Wilson (playwright) (1626–1696), English playwright
- John Wilson (Scottish writer) (1785–1854), Scottish writer, pen name Christopher North
- John Mackay Wilson (1804–1835), Scottish writer
- John Marius Wilson (1805–1885), British writer
- John Fleming Wilson (1877–1922), American author, newspaperman, and prolific writer
- John S. Wilson (music critic) (1913–2002), American music critic and jazz radio host
- John Burgess Wilson (1917–1993), British author, pen name Anthony Burgess
- John Morgan Wilson (born 1945), American journalist and author
- John Wilson (Canadian writer) (born 1951), children's writer, winner of the Norma Fleck Award
- John J. B. Wilson (born 1954), founder of the Golden Raspberry Awards, 1980

== Law ==
- Sir John Wilson (English judge) (1741–1793), English mathematician and judge
- John Wilson, Lord Ashmore (1857–1932), Scottish lawyer, parliamentary candidate, sheriff principal and judge
- John H. Wilson, American judge from New York, author of the 2006 children's book Hot House Flowers

== Military ==
- John Wilson (British Army officer, died 1819) (c. 1765–1819), British general, Lieutenant-Governor of Lower Canada in 1816
- Sir John Wilson (British Army officer, died 1856) (1780–1856), British general, acting Governor of British Ceylon in 1811–12 and 1831
- John Williams Wilson (1798–1857), English sailor
- John Alfred Wilson (1833–1904), American Civil War recipient of the Medal of Honor
- John Wilson (Royal Navy officer) (1834–1885), British admiral
- John Moulder Wilson (1837–1919), U.S. Army general and Medal of Honor recipient
- John Wilson (Medal of Honor, born 1839), recipient of the Medal of Honor in the American Civil War
- John A. Wilson (adjutant general) (1861–1938), American military officer who was Puerto Rico Adjutant General
- Jock Wilson (British Army soldier) (John Nicholson Wilson, 1903–2008), Scottish soldier and centenarian
- John Wilson (Garda) (born 1962/63), Irish Garda officer and whistleblower

== Politics and government ==
=== Canada ===
- John Wilson (Ontario politician, born 1807) (1807–1869), lawyer, judge and politician in Ontario
- John Henry Wilson (Canadian politician) (1834–1912), physician, professor and politician in Ontario
- John Wilson (New Brunswick politician) (1861–1935), member of the Legislative Assembly of New Brunswick
- John Cameron Wilson (fl. 1926–1934), member of the Ontario Provincial Parliament
- John Andrew Wilson (fl. 1920s–1930s), member of the Legislative Assembly of Saskatchewan
- John Wilson (British Columbia politician) (born 1944), member of the Legislative Assembly of British Columbia

=== United Kingdom ===
==== Scotland ====
- John Wilson (Govan MP) (1828–1905), Liberal member of parliament for Govan, 1889–1900
- John Wilson (Edinburgh MP) (1830–?), Independent Liberal member of parliament for Edinburgh Central, 1885–1886
- John Wilson (Glasgow St Rollox MP) (1837–1928), member of parliament for Glasgow St Rollox, 1900–1906
- Sir John Wilson, 1st Baronet (1844–1918), Unionist member of parliament for Falkirk Burghs
- John Gray Wilson (1915–1968), advocate, sheriff, writer and Liberal Party politician
- John Wilson (trade unionist, born 1920) (1920–1996), trade union general secretary
- John Wilson (Scottish Green politician) (born 1956), member of the Scottish Parliament

==== Other ====
- John Wilson (Castle Rising MP), member of parliament in 1621
- John Wilson (Mid Durham MP) (1837–1915), miner, trade unionist and Liberal-Labour politician
- John William Wilson (1858–1932), Liberal member of parliament for Worcestershire North, 1895–1918, and Stourbridge, 1918–1922
- John Charles Wilson (1892–1968), Northern Irish politician, Ulster Unionist member of parliament for Iveagh, 1933–1938
- Sir John Wilson (civil servant, born 1915) (1915–1993), British civil servant
- John Wilson, 2nd Baron Moran (1924–2014), British diplomat
- John Wilson (London politician) (born 1941), leader of Greater London Council in 1984

=== United States ===
- John Wilson (South Carolina politician, born 1773) (1773–1828), U.S. representative from South Carolina
- John Wilson (Massachusetts politician) (1777–1848), U.S. representative from Massachusetts
- John Lyde Wilson (1784–1849), governor of South Carolina, 1822–1824
- John Wilson (American civil servant) (1807–1876), official in the Department of the Treasury and Department of the Interior
- John Thomas Wilson (1811–1891), U.S. representative from Ohio
- John Wilson (Arkansas politician) (died 1865), speaker of the Arkansas House of Representatives
- John Frank Wilson (1846–1911), U.S. representative from Arizona Territory
- John H. Wilson (Kentucky politician) (1846–1923), lawyer and U.S. representative from Kentucky
- John L. Wilson (1850–1912), U.S. senator from Washington State
- John Haden Wilson (1867–1946), U.S. representative from Pennsylvania
- John H. Wilson (Hawaii politician) (1871–1956), mayor of Honolulu, Hawaii
- John H. Wilson (Arizona politician), member of the Arizona House of Representatives
- John J. Wilson (1926–2015), member of the New Jersey General Assembly
- John Wilson (Texas politician) (1939-1982), member of the Texas House and Senate who was elected despite being dead
- John A. Wilson (politician) (1943–1993), member of the Council of the District of Columbia
- John Wilson (Kansas politician) (born 1983), member of the Kansas House of Representatives

=== Other countries ===
- Sir John Cracroft Wilson (1808–1881), British civil servant in India, farmer and politician in New Zealand
- Bowie Wilson (John Bowie Wilson, 1820–1883), member of the New South Wales Legislative Assembly
- John Nathaniel Wilson (1822–1897), member of the New Zealand Legislative Council
- John Wilson (New Zealand mayor) (1867–1953), New Zealand businessman and mayor of Dunedin
- John Wilson (Irish politician) (1923–2007), Irish Fianna Fáil politician
- John N. Wilson (fl. 1952–1962), Indian politician

== Religion ==
- John Wilson (Dean of Ripon) (1586–1635), English Anglican priest and Dean of Ripon Minster, 1624–1634
- John Wilson (Puritan minister) (1591–1667), Puritan minister of the Boston Church in Massachusetts
- John Wilson (Scottish missionary) (1804–1875), Scottish missionary, educationalist, a founding father of Bombay
- John Marius Wilson (1805–1885), Scottish clergyman and writer
- John Alexander Wilson (missionary) (1809–1887), English Anglican missionary
- John Leighton Wilson (1809–1885), American missionary to West Africa
- John Wilson (Caddo) (1840–1901), leader in the Native American Church movement of the late 19th century
- John Wilson (Scottish priest) (1849–1926), Provost of St Mary's Cathedral, Edinburgh
- John Wilson (Royal Navy chaplain) (1890–1949), Anglican priest and Chaplain of the Fleet, 1943–1948
- Leonard Wilson (John Leonard Wilson, 1897–1970), Anglican bishop of Singapore
- John Wilson (bishop) (born 1968), Roman Catholic archbishop of Southwark, England

== Sports ==
=== American football ===
- John "Weenie" Wilson (fl. 1933–1968), American football player and multi-sport coach
- John Parker Wilson (born 1985), American football player

=== Association football ===
- John Wilson (footballer, born 1889) (1889–1914), Scottish footballer
- John Wilson (footballer, born 1914) (1914–1988), English footballer, 1930s inside right for Port Vale
- John Wilson (footballer, born 1934), English footballer, 1950s full back for Norwich and Chesterfield
- John Wilson (footballer, born 1952), English footballer, 1970s midfielder for Darlington
- John Wilson (soccer, born 1977), American soccer player

=== Baseball ===
- John Wilson (1910s pitcher) (1890–1954), Washington Senators
- John Wilson (1920s pitcher) (1903–1980), Boston Red Sox

=== Cricket ===
- John Wilson (Yorkshire cricketer) (1857–1931), English cricketer
- John Wilson (Tasmania cricketer) (1868–1906), Australian cricketer
- John Wilson (New South Wales cricketer) (born 1947), Australian cricketer
- John Wilson (New Zealand cricketer) (born 1957), New Zealand cricketer

=== Rugby ===
- John Skinner Wilson (rugby union) (1884–1916), Trinidad-born rugby player who represented Scotland
- John Howard Wilson (1930–2015), Scottish rugby union player
- John Wilson (New Zealand rugby league) (fl. 1972–1977), New Zealand rugby league international
- John Wilson (rugby league, born 1978), France international rugby league footballer

=== Other sports ===
- John Wilson (cyclist) (1876–1957), British Olympic road racing cyclist and rugby league administrator
- John Wilson (sport shooter) (1879–1940), Dutch sport shooter
- John Wilson (Australian footballer) (1940–2019), Australian rules footballer for Richmond
- John Wilson (speedway rider) (born 1941), motorcycle speedway rider
- John Wilson (angler) (1943–2018), British angler
- John Wilson (sprinter) (born 1948), English sprinter
- Jocky Wilson (John Thomas Wilson, 1950–2012), Scottish darts player
- John Wilson (golfer) (born 1959), American professional golfer
- John Wilson (boxer) (born 1972), Scottish boxer
- John Wilson (basketball) (born 1987), Filipino basketball player

== Other people ==
- John Wilson, an alias of John Smith (housebreaker) (c. 1661–after 1727), English housebreaker
- John Macaulay Wilson (fl. 1794–1827), African king and doctor
- John Wilson (Israelist) (1799–1870), author of Our Israelitish Origin (1840), a founding text of British Israelism
- John W. Wilson (1815–1883), Belgian art collector and businessman
- John West Wilson (1816–1889), British/Swedish businessman and arts patron
- John Wilson (philanthropist) (1826–1900), Irish-born pioneer of the American West
- John Wilson (businessman) (1829–1909), New Zealand farmer, soldier, judge
- J. S. Wilson (John Skinner Wilson, 1888–1969), Scottish scouting organizer
- Sir John Wilson, 2nd Baronet (1898–1975), Keeper of the Royal Philatelic Collection
- John C. Wilson (1899–1961), Broadway producer and director
- John Wilson (blind activist) (1919–1999), founder of International Agency for the Prevention of Blindness
- Jock Wilson (police officer) (John Spark Wilson, 1922–1993), British police officer
- John S. Wilson (economist) (born 1956), American economist at the World Bank
- John Wilson (broadcaster) (born 1965), British journalist and broadcaster

== Other uses ==
- John Wilson (ice skating company), a British company
- John Wilson Orchestra, formed by British conductor John Wilson in 1994
- John W. Wilson, a GWR 3031 Class locomotive on the Great Western Railway in 1891–1915, renamed Walter Robinson in 1901

== See also ==
- John S. Wilson (disambiguation)
- John Skinner Wilson (disambiguation)
- Johnny Wilson (disambiguation)
- Jonathan Wilson (disambiguation)
- Jack Wilson (disambiguation)
- Jock Wilson (disambiguation)
- John Waterloo Wilson (disambiguation)
- John Wilson Walton-Wilson (1823–1910), English architect
