= John S. Wilson =

John S. Wilson may refer to:

- John Wilson (1920s pitcher) (1903–1980), John Samuel Wilson, Major League Baseball pitcher
- John S. Wilson (music critic) (1913–2002), American music critic and jazz radio host
- John Stuart Wilson (born 1944), mathematician
- John S. Wilson (economist) (born 1956), at the World Bank
- J. S. Wilson (1888–1969), John Skinner Wilson, pioneer of Scouting
- John Silvanus Wilson, Jr. Morehouse College president

== See also ==
- John Wilson (disambiguation)
