= John A. Wilson =

John A. Wilson may refer to:

- John A. Wilson (adjutant general) (1861–1938), American military officer who was Puerto Rico Adjutant General
- John A. Wilson (politician) (1943–1993), member of the Council of the District of Columbia
- John A. Wilson (sculptor) (1877–1954), Canadian sculptor in Nova Scotia
- John A. Wilson (topographical engineer) (1789–1833), American chief engineer on the Columbia and Philadelphia Railroad
- John Albert Wilson (1899–1976), American Egyptologist
- John Alexander Wilson (businessman) (1829–1909), New Zealand farmer, soldier, public servant, judge and businessman
- John Alexander Wilson (missionary) (1809–1887), English Anglican missionary
- John Alfred Wilson (1833–1904), American Civil War recipient of the Medal of Honor
- John Andrew Wilson (fl. 1920s–1930s), member of the Legislative Assembly of Saskatchewan
- John Appleton Wilson (1851–1927), American architect
- John Armistead Wilson (1879–1954), Scottish-born Canadian engineer and aviation pioneer
- Willie Wilson (drummer) (John Andrew Wilson, born 1947), English drummer, member of Quiver

== See also ==
- John Wilson (disambiguation)
