= Henry Roe Campbell =

American surveyor and civil engineer

- Born: September 9, 1807; Woodbury, Gloucester County, New Jersey, United States
- Died: February 6, 1879 (aged 71); Woodbury, Gloucester County, New Jersey, United States
- Occupations: surveyor, civil engineer, Locomotive designers, Railroad executive

Notes
- Campbell's son, Joseph B. Campbell was a West Point graduate and Civil War veteran.

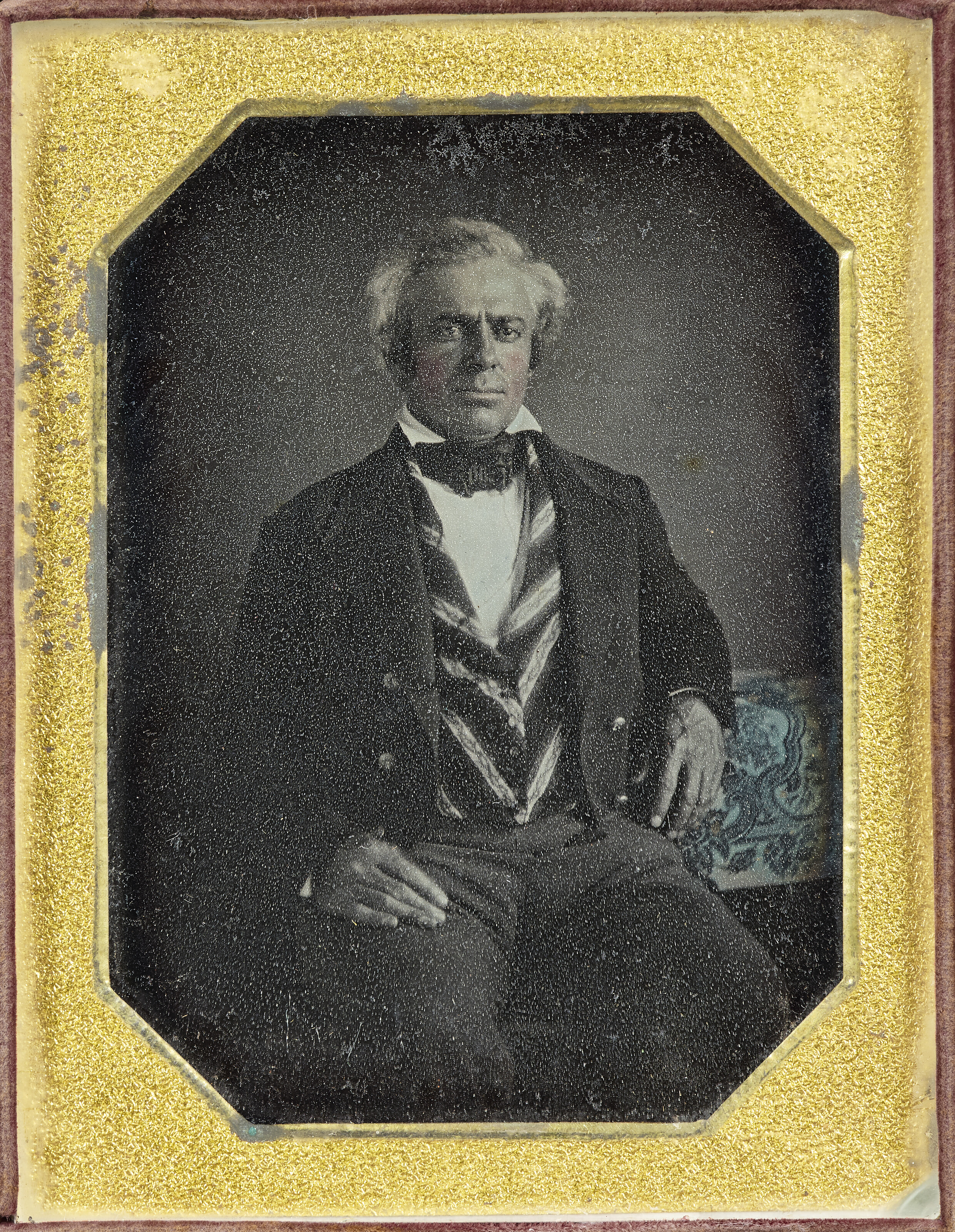
Daguerreotype of Campbell, around 1850

Henry Roe Campbell (September 9, 1807 – February 6, 1879) was an American surveyor and civil engineer. Campbell contributed to American railroading and bridge-building in the first half of the 19th century. Campbell patented his 4-4-0 design in February 1836, just a few months before the patent law was changed to require that claims include proof of originality or novelty.

The 4-4-0 or American type steam locomotive was the most popular wheel arrangement in 19th century American railroads and was widely copied. White noted that the design was successful because it "... met every requirement of early United States railroads".

At the end of Campbell's career. a Harper's Magazine article in March 1879 noted that the impact Campbell's design played in railroad development in the United States when it wrote:

English railroads were short, solid, straight and level, and laid with the best rails in the world; and their massive and powerful, and rigid-framed engines are thoroughly adopted to those perfect roads. On the contrary, the American road is generally of great length, and being necessarily cheap it "goes as you please." Over these eccentric roads the American locomotive adjusts itself to every change of level both across and along the line; it takes curves that would be impossible for the rigid English engine; and, finally, it runs over a crazy track, up hill and down, in perfect safety. It has been well said that all that the English engine can do on a perfect road the American (4-4-0) engine will do; and much more than this, it will do work on any road, however rough, hilly, curved and cheap.

Not only did the new American Type steam locomotive deliver more horsepower, tractive effort, and reliability it also laid the groundwork for locomotive engineering in the 19th century with boilers mounted horizontally (instead of vertically), smoke stacks mounted vertically at the front to expel the smoke and cinders away from the crew and passengers.

This design also provided greater protection with an enclosed cab and many other features including things like cowcatchers, front-mounted headlamps/lights, etc.).

While Campbell's 4-4-0 design was less attractive by the end of the 19th century as more powerful locomotives took their place such as the 4-6-0 wheel arrangement and Consolidations of the 2-8-0 wheel arrangement even though some 4-4-0s remained in service into the 1940s, over 100 years after the design was initially conceived.

== Early life and works ==
Henry Roe Campbell was born on September 9, 1807, in Woodbury, New Jersey, to Amos Campbell, (1779 in Bucks County, Pa; died 1868) and Ann Roe . Amos Campbell was a bridge builder and of Scottish descent, settled in Pennsylvania in 1837. His mother's family, the Roe's were among the early settlers of New Jersey.

Henry was one of nine children in the family. Henry's brother John D. Campbell (1821–1863) would also go on to become a civil engineer while helping his brother Henry construct bridges for the Vermont Central Railroad, and then went on to become superintendent of the Michigan Southern and Northern Indiana Railroad.

Henry Roe Campbell married Sidney Boyd of Lancaster, Pa. in 1833. Henry met Sidney while he worked on the Philadelphia & Columbia Railroad. Two are their sons were Joseph Boyd Campbell (1836–1891), a graduate of West Point (Class of 1861) and civil war veteran (Battle of Antietam) and Henry Roe Campbell Jr., who was also involved in railroads and civil engineering.

=== Covered bridge builder ===
His father, Amos Campbell, was a well-known covered bridge builder using Ithiel Town's patented lattice truss bridge. Starting in 1820, the father, a master carpenter, built covered bridges over the Delaware (Centre bridge - 1840), Schuylkill and Conestoga Rivers.

In 1849, at age 70, Amos traveled to Maumee, Ohio to erect the largest covered bridge he had ever built.

As a young person, Henry Campbell learned architecture and civil engineering while working as an apprentice to his father.

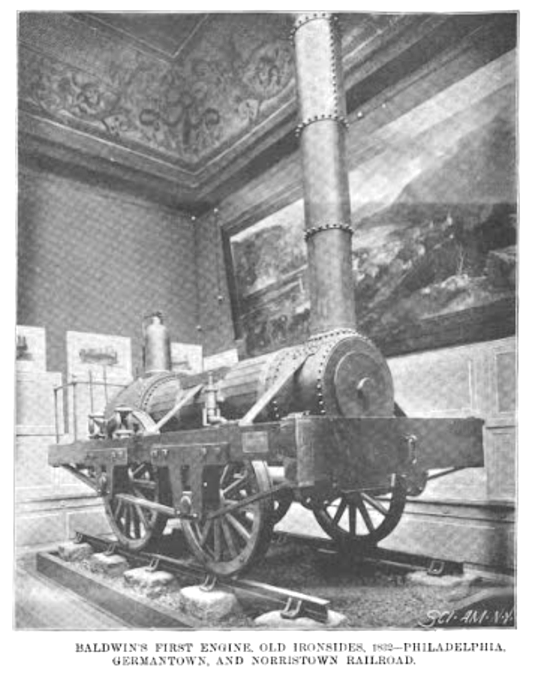
Matthias Baldwin's first steam locomotive (2-2-0), "old ironsides", delivered to the Philadelphia and Germantown Railroad in 1832.

=== Philadelphia and Columbia Railroad ===
In April 1828, Major John A. Wilson, US Army Corps of Engineers was charged with locating the route of the railroad between Columbia, Pennsylvania, and Philadelphia, with a survey party that included among others John Edgar Thomson, future Pennsylvania railroad engineer and president, assistant engineers; John P. Baily, Samuel W. Mifflin (1805–1885), future chief engineer of the Huntington and Broad Top Railroad, Major Wilson's son and future PRR executive, William Hasell Wilson, and Campbell. Henry R. Campbell remained on the Columbia Railway as assistant and principal assistant engineer until February, 1832, when he received the appointment of chief engineer of the Philadelphia, Germantown & Norristown Railroad.

=== Philadelphia, Germantown & Norristown Railroad ===
In 1832 Campbell became the chief engineer of the Philadelphia, Germantown & Norristown Railroad (PG&N). Herman Haupt, fresh out of West Point, served Campbell as an apprentice on the PG&N.

During this period, Campbell became quite busy designing other rail lines and structures while still employed as the PG&N's chief engineer. He drafted plans for a bridge on the Rensselaer and Saratoga Railroad in New York. He also served as engineer for the West Philadelphia railroad in 1835–1836.

Campbell resigned his position with the Philadelphia, Germantown & Norristown Railroad in 1839 to become an independent civil engineer, taking on a variety of projects such as engineering the Norristown & Valley Railroad.

=== West Philadelphia Railroad ===
The West Philadelphia Railroad as conceived of as a way to eliminate the use of an inclined plane (Belmont Plane) on the Philadelphia & Columbia Railroad. In March 1835, Campbell reported on his engineering recommendations for the proposed railroad alignment starting near the Columbia Bridge over the Schuylkill River and converged with the existing State owned railway on Lancaster pike. The total length of the alignment as proposed varied from 8 to 9 miles with a practical grade of 40 feet per mile.

=== Camden & Woodbury Railroad ===
With his father, Amos Campbell, Campbell constructed the 8-mile Camden & Woodbury Railroad which opened on January 29, 1838.

=== Gettysburg Railroad ===
Working for the State of Pennsylvania, Campbell drafted a map and profile of the proposed Gettysburg Railroad in Pennsylvania in 1839.

=== Locomotive designer and builder ===
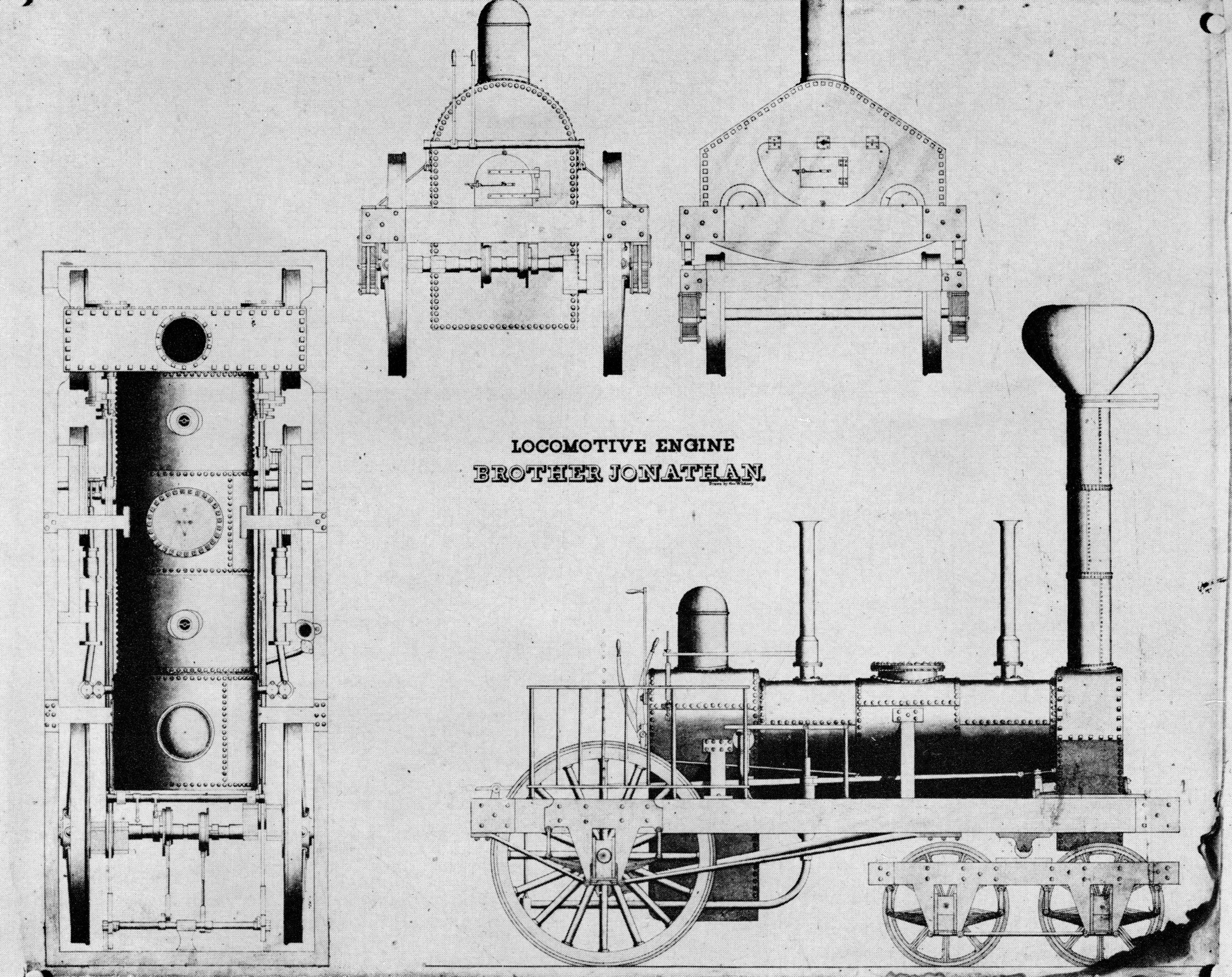
Schematic of the first 4-2-0 locomotive, the Brother Jonathan

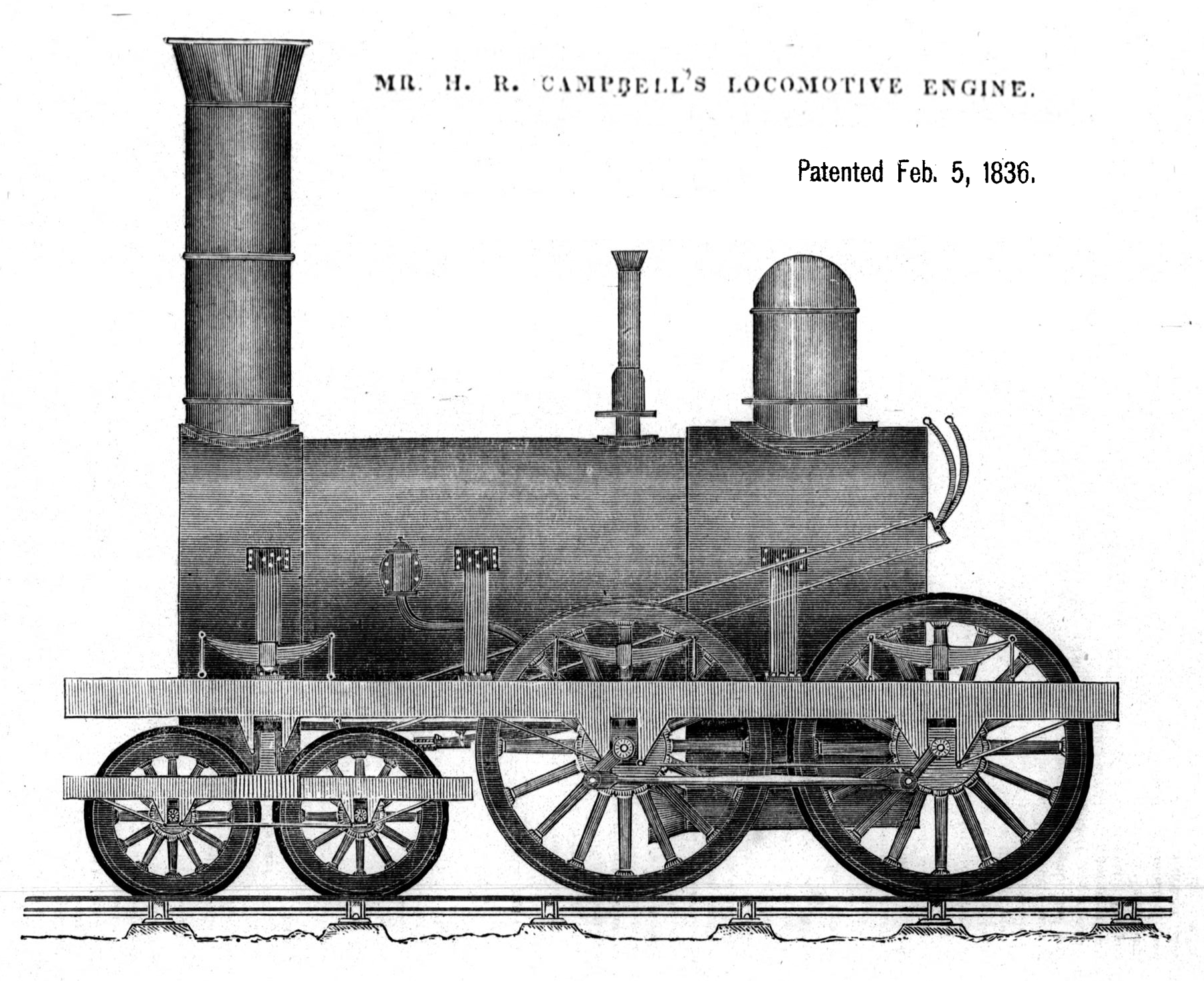
1836 picture of the first 4-4-0 steam locomotive

One of the most visually striking features of a steam locomotive is its wheel arrangement which is largely a function of its intended application and purpose. The fundamental principle of design for 19th century steam locomotives was tractive force which relies on adhesion. A switching locomotive for example, is relatively low-powered but with a high starting tractive effort for getting heavy cars rolling quickly. These locomotives are geared to produce high torque but are restricted to low top speeds and have small diameter driving wheels. Switchers are rail analogs to tugboats. For higher speeds, larger boilers were required which in turn led to the development of lead trucks.

Prior to 1832, the typical locomotive for general road service on American roads was a 2-2-0 which could be built with either inside or outside steam cylinders. The critical element of the design was the single pair of driving wheels placed either in front of the firebox, as in the Norris engines, or in back of the firebox, as patented in 1834 by E. L. Miller and used extensively by in the Baldwin engines. The key constraint in this approach was that it had limited traction because of the single driver. These locomotives were equally characterized by both axles, powered or unpowered, being of equal size. Even though the locomotive had the 2-2-0 designation, the leading axle was unpowered and not a lead truck.

During this period, Baldwin had already assembled one British locomotive, the Delaware for the Newcastle and Frenchtown railroad and made a detailed inspection of another, the John Bull intended for the Camden and Amboy railroad. It was ready for its American design locomotive. In 1832, Campbell was chief engineer for the Philadelphia, Germantown and Norristown Railroad when that line first adopted steam power with the delivery of Matthias Baldwin's first locomotive,"old ironsides" an 2-2-0 with 54 inch diameter driving wheels, 45 inch lead wheels and 9.5 inch cylinders that was a copy of Robert Stephenson's "Planet" locomotive. Baldwin experienced considerable difficulties before the locomotive performed satisfactorily, but the difficulties encountered were as nothing compared with those the English builders had to overcome. Baldwin's locomotive traversed one mile in 58 seconds. Still, Baldwin's problems arose from defective exhaust pipes, valve gear and steam joints, all required reconstruction. Baldwin was forced to wait on payment and in the end took a $500 penalty on the price. As a design, Baldwin never repeated it as the locomotive amply demonstrated the problems with using rigid British locomotives on American railroads.

This Baldwin delivery was only one year after the Best Friend of Charleston was built, the first locomotive to be built entirely within the United States for revenue service. It also produced the first locomotive boiler explosion in the US. Over the next five years, the Philadelphia, Germantown and Norristown Railroad with Campbell as Chief Engineer would take delivery of the following locomotives, all 2-2-0s:

- Old Ironsides 10 hp Baldwin 1832
- Sampson 12 hp Newcastle Co. 1832
- Velocity 12 hp West Point Foundry 1834
- Star 8 hp Wm. Norris 1834
- Eagle 20 hp Baldwin 1835
- Arrow 10 hp Newcastle Co. 1835
- Arabian 20 hp Baldwin 1836

The problem with these locomotives was weight distribution. This concern influenced Campbell to design a locomotive that would be easy on American track which was relatively light and very flexible. By 1835, strap rails laid on wooden stringers were still the rule, and the Beaver Meadow railroad which was the site of the recent improvements with Jervis' 4-2-0, was considered particularly substantial with strap rails, 2.5 inches wide, laid on substantial pine stringers.

Campbell's solution to the problem of weight distribution and tractive effort was to develop two coupled drivers, one in front of the boiler and one at the rear with a two axle lead truck.

With the issuance of his patent in 1836, Campbell worked with James Brooks to build the first 4-4-0 using his idea. Although it proved to develop 60 percent more tractive effort than the Standard Baldwin 4-2-0, it was not widely adopted. This was largely because of the rigid frame which did not allow for maintaining equal weight on the drivers and it was prone to derail. This problem was solved by Joseph Harrison Jr., partner in the American steam locomotive manufacturing firm of Eastwick and Harrison with the development of the equalising beam. Campbell tried to sue Eastwick for patent infringement With no success.

By 1840, Campbell established his own locomotive works in the Northern Liberties section of Philadelphia.

Campbell then engineered and built three locomotives for the Philadelphia and Columbia Railroad. These locomotives weighed thirteen tons, cylinders were twelve and a-half inches in diameter; stroke was sixteen inches, driving wheels fifty-four inches diameter, and capable of transporting from one hundred and twenty to one hundred and forty tons over the road.

Several years later in 1843, Campbell sued Locks and Canals over its production of 4-4-0 locomotives with an unknown degree of success. Campbell's design with Harrison's equalizer as a concept was criticized at first by the other locomotive builders. But by 1845, the advantages were apparent and Matthias Baldwin unable to sell any of its proprietary 4-2-0 designs, bought the Campbell and Harrison patents. This ended Campbell's career as a locomotive builder.

=== Vermont Central Railroad ===
By the late 1840s, Campbell had left Philadelphia for New England, where he worked as chief engineer for the Vermont Central Railroad and the Vermont & Canada Railroad. He designed and constructed many covered bridges in New England and became known as the bridge-builder of New England.

=== Philadelphia and Erie Railroad ===
During the 1860s, Campbell returned to Pennsylvania and continued to accept a variety of bridge and construction contracts. Campbell was resident engineer for the construction by the Philadelphia and Erie Railroad of a freight classification yard and repair facility at Renovo, Pennsylvania in 1866.

=== Keystone Bridge Company ===
In 1875, Campbell working for Keystone Bridge Company, completed what was then attributed to be the longest swing-span movable bridge (472 feet in length) in the world at Perth Amboy in New Jersey but the harsh winter weather of that project eventually caused his demise.

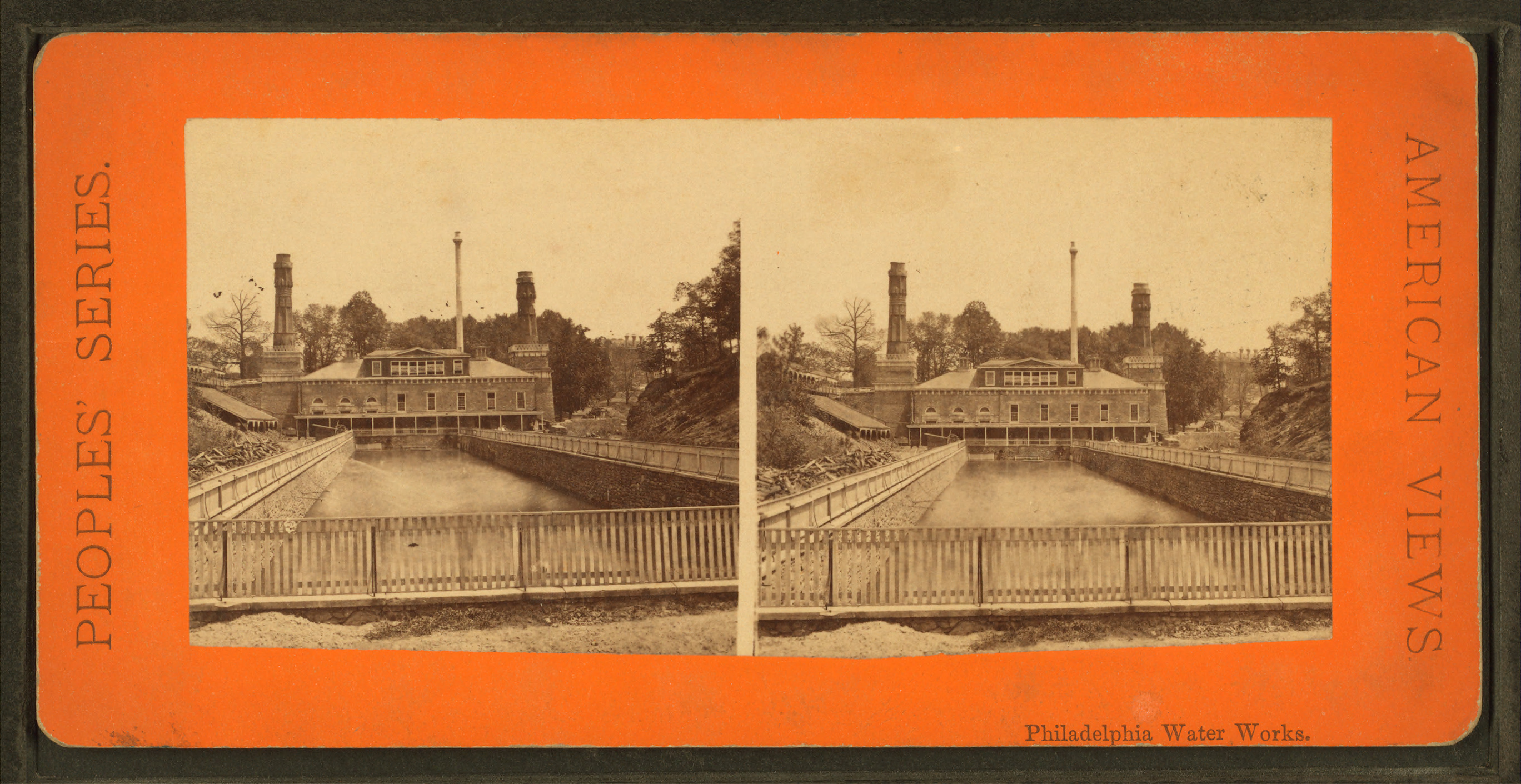
Philadelphia Water Works, from Robert N. Dennis collection of stereoscopic views

=== Works ===
- Philadelphia, Germantown, and Norristown Rail Road Company., Campbell, H. R., & Strickend, W. (1833). Report and estimates of the engineers of the Philadelphia, Germantown and Norristown Rail-Road Company. Philadelphia: publisher not identified.
- The Committee on Science and the Arts constituted by the Franklin Institute of the State of Pennsylvania for the promotion of the Mechanic Arts to whom was referred for examination a Spirit Level invented by Mr Henry R Campbell of Philadelphia. (1835)
- Campbell, H. R., Kramm, G., & Lehman & Duval Lithrs. (1835). Plan of the West-Philadelphia Rail-Road. Philadelphia: Lehman & Duval Lithrs. For Map see this website.
- West Philadelphia Rail Road Company. First annual report of the West Philadelphia Rail Road Company. Philadelphia, 1835. 9pp. Source Library:The American Antiquarian Society
- Campbell, H. R. (1837) Report of Surveys Made to Avoid the Inclined Plane Upon and for the Improvement of the Columbia and Philadelphia Rail Road; by Order of the Canal Commissioners of the State of Pennsylvania. A. Seyfert & Company, Philadelphia, Pennsylvania.
- Campbell, H. R., & Gettysburg Railroad. (1839). Map and profile of the Gettysburg Rail Road as surveyed by order of the legislature of Pennsylvania, 1839. Philadelphia.
- Strickland, W., Gill, E. H., & Campbell, H. R. (1841). Reports, specifications, and estimates of public works in the United States of America: Comprising the Philadelphia gas works; reservoir dam across the Swatara; twin locks on the Schuylkill Canal; Delaware Breakwater; Philadelphia Water Works; dam and lock on the Sandy and Beaver Canal; dam on the James River and Kanawha Canal, Virginia; locks of eight feet lift, on the same aqueducts across Rivanna River and Byrd Creek, on the same; superstructure, etc., of farm bridges, on the same; lock gates and mitre sills. London: J. Weale.

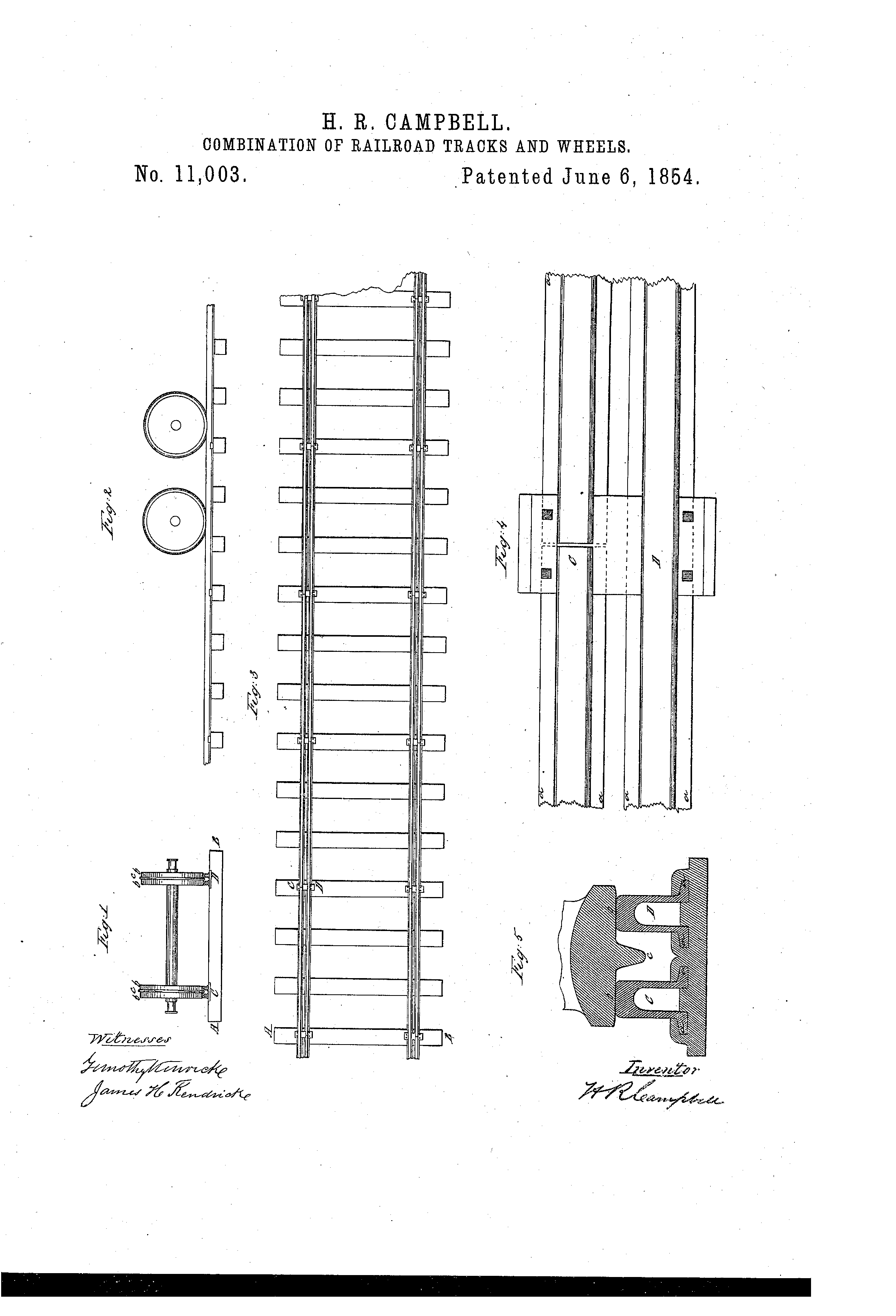
Campbell patent depicting rail wheel and rail interaction with inverted U rails

=== Patents ===
Campbell received two patents for his work:

- Patent No. 9,355 For the 4-4-0 Locomotive configuration. This locomotive had a three-point suspension and a leading truck and operated well on uneven tracks as well as powerful because of its four connected driving wheels.
- Patent No. 11,003 which was for a double rail system of inverted "U" rails where the flange on the carriage wheel rode between the rails such that it allowed the flanges of the wheels to run freely between them.

=== Legacy ===
While Campbell originally conceived of and patented the 4-4-0 design and would later sue for any patent infringement, he originally included a rigid front truck which could not successfully negotiate curves in the rails or uneven track. The Eastwick & Harrison Company beat him to the punch on this much needed design improvement, delivering its first, the Hercules (locomotive) to the Beaver Meadow Railroad in 1837.

A number of American Type steam locomotives have been preserved and a few even remain in operation.

- Baltimore & Ohio Railroad #25, the William Mason on exhibition in Baltimore, Maryland at the Baltimore and Ohio Railroad Museum built in 1856, used in "The Great Locomotive Chase, and later the movie Wild Wild West. Second oldest operating locomotive after KFNB Licaon in Western Hemisphere, and third oldest in the world after the 1855 Fairy Queen.
- Central Pacific's numbers 60, Jupiter, and 63 Leviathan. Although both engines have been scrapped, and therefore technically do not count as having been preserved, there were exact, full size operating replicas built in recent years. The Jupiter was built for the National Park Service along with a replica of Union Pacific's 119 for use at their Golden Spike National Historic Site. Leviathan was finished in 2009, is privately owned, and travels to various railroads to operate.
- Wilmington & Western #98 4-4-0 American #98 was built by the American Locomotive Company of Schenectady, NY in January 1909 (construction #45921). The locomotive was built for the Mississippi Central Railroad of Hattiesburg, Mississippi. The engine ran for the Mississippi Central Railroad from 1909 to 1944, before it was sold to Paulsen Spence, the owner of the Louisiana Eastern Railroad. The engine was sold again to Thomas C. Marshall, in 1960, and was moved to the Strasburg Rail Road in 1961 for storage. The locomotive was moved to the Wilmington and Western in 1964, and would start operating on the Wilmington and Western, in the fall of 1972. The Engine is currently one of two operational American Type steam locomotives, east of the Mississippi. The engine is expected to be taken out of service in 2019 for its Federally Mandated 1,472 Day Inspection.
- Pennsylvania D16 #1223.
- Santa Cruz Railroad No. 3 is a narrow gauge steam locomotive in Washington D.C. It is one of three preserved Baldwin Class 8/18 C 4-4-0 locomotives in the United States, the other two being the North Pacific Coast Railroad no. 12, the "Sonoma" displayed at the California State Railroad Museum, and the Eureka and Palisade Railroad no. 4, the "Eureka" which is privately owned, the latter of which it is the only operable example. It was common practice for American railroads of the 19th century to name their engines after Jupiter, "King of Gods", and other mythological figures to attract attention, thus the engine should not be confused with the engine of Golden Spike fame.

=== Death ===
Campbell died in Woodbury, New Jersey, on February 6, 1879, and is interred in Green Cemetery, Woodbury, Gloucester, New Jersey.
