= John Waterloo Wilson =

John Waterloo Wilson may refer to:

- John W. Wilson (1815–1883), Belgian art collector
- John Wilson (sport shooter) (1879–1940), Olympic athlete and his grandson

== See also ==
- John Wilson (disambiguation)
