= John Alexander Wilson =

John Alexander Wilson may refer to:

- John Wilson (businessman) (1829–1909), New Zealand farmer, soldier, public servant, judge and businessman
- John Alexander Wilson (missionary) (1809–1887), Anglican missionary
