= List of listed buildings in Edinburgh/1 =

This is a list of listed buildings in Edinburgh, Scotland.

== List ==
Name	Location	Date Listed	Grid Ref. (Note: Sometimes known as OSGB36, the grid reference (where provided) is based on the British national grid reference system used by the Ordnance Survey. • "Guide to National Grid". Ordnance Survey. • "Get-a-map". Ordnance Survey.)	Geo-coordinates	Notes	LB Number (Note: Historic Environment Scotland assign a unique alphanumeric identifier to each designated site in Scotland, for listed buildings this always begins with "LB", for example "LB12345".)	Image
Kirkliston Village Newliston Road, Former Kirkliston Distillery, Production Block Including Malt Barns And Double Kiln And Separate Still House				55°57′11″N 3°24′27″W	Category C(S)	45644	Upload Photo
55/55A Boswall Parkway, Granton Parish Church And Church Hall, Including War Memorial				55°58′35″N 3°13′27″W	Category B	45645	Upload Photo
61 Boswall Parkway, Granton Congregational Church				55°58′34″N 3°13′40″W	Category C(S)	45646	Upload Photo
8 Granton Square, Former Granton Hotel And Hms Claverhouse, Including Lamp Standards				55°58′50″N 3°13′25″W	Category B	45655	Upload Photo
20 West Harbour Road, Including Rear Outbuildings				55°58′55″N 3°13′43″W	Category C(S)	45659	Upload Photo
2 Seafield Street, Filliside House With Boundary Walls				55°58′08″N 3°08′46″W	Category B	45576	Upload Photo
Dundas Castle, Brown Acre, Lilac Cottage, Rose Cottage And Dundas Mains, Including Railings, Gates And Wall				55°58′40″N 3°25′31″W	Category B	45472	Upload Photo
Circus Lane, Nos 3-15 (Odd Nos), 19-57 (Odd Nos) And Nos 6-10 (Even Nos), Including Walls				55°57′28″N 3°12′22″W	Category B	45477	Upload Photo
1 Northumberland Place				55°57′26″N 3°11′44″W	Category B	45518	Upload Photo
13 St Vincent Street, St Vincent Church (Episcopal), Including Gatepiers And Railings				55°57′30″N 3°12′14″W	Category B	45522	Upload another image
Bankhead, 3 Bankhead Cottages				55°59′11″N 3°22′35″W	Category C(S)	45431	Upload Photo
2-12 (Even Nos) Torphichen Street, Including Railings				55°56′49″N 3°12′53″W	Category B	44923	Upload Photo
41-45 (Odd Nos) Gilmore Place, Little Sisters Of The Poor /St Joseph's Nursing Home, Including Boundary Walls, Gatepiers And Gates				55°56′29″N 3°12′24″W	Category C(S)	44937	Upload Photo
114-116 St John's Road, Harp Hotel Including Boundary Walls, Gatepiers And Gates				55°56′35″N 3°17′02″W	Category C(S)	44757	Upload Photo
20 And 20A West Mayfield, Mayfield House Including Boundary Walls, Gatepiers And Pedestrian Gates				55°56′00″N 3°10′34″W	Category C(S)	44440	Upload Photo
West Savile Road And Craigmillar Park, Royal Blind School, Including Boundary Walls And Gate Lodge				55°55′52″N 3°10′19″W	Category C(S)	44443	Upload Photo
5 Blacket Avenue, Belleville Lodge, Including Gatepiers, Boundary Walls, Pedestrian And Carriage Gates				55°56′12″N 3°10′26″W	Category C(S)	44189	Upload Photo
27 And 29 Blacket Place, Including Boundary Walls				55°56′07″N 3°10′23″W	Category C(S)	44200	Upload Photo
60 And 62 Blacket Place, Including Boundary Walls				55°56′07″N 3°10′26″W	Category C(S)	44203	Upload Photo
6, 6A, 6B And 8 Craigmillar Park, Belmont House, Including Gatepiers And Boundary Walls				55°55′48″N 3°10′16″W	Category B	44207	Upload Photo
Craigmillar Park, Craigmillar Park Church Including War Memorial, Gatepiers And Boundary Walls				55°55′51″N 3°10′18″W	Category B	44210	Upload Photo
1-5 (Inclusive Nos) Gordon Terrace, Including Boundary Walls				55°55′32″N 3°10′03″W	Category C(S)	44217	Upload Photo
10 And 12 Lygon Road, Including Boundary Walls				55°55′35″N 3°10′10″W	Category C(S)	44224	Upload Photo
2-28 (Even Nos) Moston Terrace And 13 Bright's Crescent, Including Boundary Walls And Pedestrian Gate				55°55′55″N 3°10′33″W	Category C(S)	44248	Upload Photo
Observatory Road, Blackford Hill, The Royal Observatory, Astronomer's House				55°55′22″N 3°11′18″W	Category B	44249	Upload Photo
37 Barnton Avenue West And Gamekeeper's Road, Cargilfield School, Including Chapel, Nursery, Cricket Pavilion, Boundary Walls, Gatepiers And Gates				55°58′10″N 3°18′09″W	Category B	43929	Upload Photo
188 And 190 Ferry Road Including Boundary Walls				55°58′26″N 3°11′25″W	Category C(S)	43693	Upload Photo
4-12 (Even Nos) Great Michael Rise				55°58′47″N 3°11′33″W	Category B	43700	Upload Photo
1-8 Industry Homes, Industry Lane				55°58′31″N 3°11′05″W	Category C(S)	43702	Upload Photo
2-16 (Even Nos) New Lane, Newhaven				55°58′47″N 3°11′28″W	Category B	43711	Upload Photo
Newhaven, Old Harbour Light				55°58′56″N 3°11′45″W	Category B	43713	Upload Photo
148 Newhaven Road, Including Boundary Wall				55°58′33″N 3°11′28″W	Category C(S)	43715	Upload Photo
8, 9, 10 Pier Place, Former St Andrew's Free Church And Halls				55°58′50″N 3°11′47″W	Category B	43724	Upload Photo
14 And 16 Hill Street				55°57′12″N 3°12′09″W	Category A	43302	Upload Photo
118 Princes Street And 2 Castle Street				55°57′04″N 3°12′11″W	Category B	43325	Upload Photo
119, 119A And 120 Princes Street				55°57′04″N 3°12′12″W	Category B	43326	Upload Photo
Rose Street, Eagle Buildings				55°57′11″N 3°11′45″W	Category B	43330	Upload Photo
133A To 137 (Odd Nos) Rose Street And 101 And 103 Rose Street North Lane				55°57′06″N 3°12′15″W	Category B	43333	Upload Photo
32 Rose Street				55°57′10″N 3°11′47″W	Category C(S)	43336	Upload Photo
108 Rose Street				55°57′08″N 3°12′02″W	Category C(S)	43338	Upload Photo
35-39 (Odd Nos) Thistle Street With Boundary Wall To Rear				55°57′15″N 3°11′56″W	Category B	43356	Upload Photo
16 Young Street				55°57′10″N 3°12′20″W	Category A	43367	Upload Photo
55 And 57 Frogston Road East, Mortonhall House, Former Kennels				55°54′09″N 3°11′10″W	Category C(S)	43239	Upload Photo
30B Howdenhall Road, Mortonhall Crematorium With Remembrance Chapel, Waiting Room, Lodge Houses And Screen Walls				55°54′09″N 3°10′13″W	Category A	43242	Upload another image See more images
75 Kirkbrae, Mount Pleasant With Gatepiers, Garden Walls, Greenhouse And Summerhouse				55°54′54″N 3°09′39″W	Category B	43243	Upload Photo
77 Kirkbrae, Covington With Gatepiers, Garden Walls And Greenhouse				55°54′53″N 3°09′40″W	Category C(S)	43244	Upload Photo
81 Kirk Brae, St Hilda's				55°54′50″N 3°09′36″W	Category C(S)	43249	Upload Photo
Lasswade Road, 1-16 (Inclusive Nos) Lockerby Cottages With Screen Walls, Gatepiers, Garden Walls And Railings				55°54′19″N 3°09′01″W	Category B	43263	Upload Photo
13A George Street, Known As Crippled Aid Building				55°57′15″N 3°11′45″W	Category C(S)	43285	Upload Photo
21 Dalkeith Road And Holyrood Park Road, Royal Commonwealth Pool				55°56′21″N 3°10′22″W	Category A	43148	Upload another image
8 And 12-20 (Even Nos) Newington Road				55°56′19″N 3°10′46″W	Category C(S)	43161	Upload Photo
22-30 (Even Nos) Newington Road				55°56′18″N 3°10′45″W	Category C(S)	43162	Upload Photo
32 And 33 High Street				55°59′24″N 3°23′44″W	Category B	40381	Upload Photo
6 Mid Terrace				55°59′24″N 3°23′45″W	Category C(S)	40398	Upload Photo
High Street (In Front Of Tolbooth), K6 Telephone Kiosk				55°59′25″N 3°23′49″W	Category B	40413	Upload Photo
37 Station Road, Ashburnham Lodge				55°59′15″N 3°23′13″W	Category C(S)	40415	Upload Photo
12 East Terrace, St. Helen's				55°59′22″N 3°23′38″W	Category B	40342	Upload Photo
18 East Terrace				55°59′23″N 3°23′41″W	Category B	40347	Upload Photo
8-16 (Inclusive Numbers) Echline				55°59′07″N 3°25′02″W	Category B	40352	Upload Photo
9 Edinburgh Road And Boundary Walls				55°59′24″N 3°23′33″W	Category B	40361	Upload Photo
4 And 6 Edinburgh Road				55°59′23″N 3°23′34″W	Category C(S)	40363	Upload Photo
171 Whitehouse Loan Sidney Lodge Including Stables, Gatepiers And Boundary Walls				55°55′53″N 3°11′58″W	Category B	30669	Upload Photo
3 Whitehouse Terrace Braemar House Including Gatepiers And Boundary Walls				55°55′54″N 3°11′52″W	Category B	30673	Upload Photo
8 Whitehouse Terrace "Ainslie Grange" Hotel Including Lodge, Gatepiers And Boundary Walls				55°55′52″N 3°11′39″W	Category B	30677	Upload Photo
36 (Formerly 4) South Oswald Road				55°55′44″N 3°11′36″W	Category B	30593	Upload Photo
12-19 (Inclusive Nos) Strathearn Road				55°56′03″N 3°11′45″W	Category B	30603	Upload Photo
3-17 (Inclusive Nos) Thirlestane Lane Mews				55°56′06″N 3°11′44″W	Category C(S)	30606	Upload another image
35-37 (Odd Nos) Warrender Park Rd & 27 27A 27B 27C Marchmont Road				55°56′19″N 3°11′41″W	Category B	30617	Upload another image
39-43 (Odd Nos) Warrender Park Rd & 22-30 Marchmont Rd				55°56′18″N 3°11′42″W	Category B	30618	Upload another image
42-46 (Even Nos) Warrender Park Road				55°56′17″N 3°11′39″W	Category C(S)	30642	Upload Photo
20-22 (Incl Nos) Warrender Park Terrace Incl Railings				55°56′21″N 3°11′51″W	Category B	30651	Upload another image
23 Warrender Park Terrace And 2 & 4 Spottiswoode Street				55°56′21″N 3°11′52″W	Category B	30652	Upload another image
30-32 (Inclusive Nos) Warrender Park Terrace				55°56′20″N 3°11′56″W	Category B	30655	Upload another image
113 Whitehouse Loan Gillis College Rc Chapel				55°56′05″N 3°12′02″W	Category A	30664	Upload Photo
1-21 (Inclusive Nos) Greenhill Place				55°56′02″N 3°12′13″W	Category B	30522	Upload another image
1-12 Greenhill Terrace Gates Gatepiers And Boundary Wall				55°56′08″N 3°12′11″W	Category C(S)	30523	Upload another image
57 Lauderdale Street, James Gillespie's High School, Bruntsfield House Including Gateways And Boundary Walls				55°56′12″N 3°11′58″W	Category A	30530	Upload Photo
31 Marchmont Crescent				55°56′16″N 3°11′37″W	Category B	30532	Upload Photo
23 Marchmont Road				55°56′20″N 3°11′41″W	Category B	30543	Upload Photo
55 Marchmont Road				55°56′15″N 3°11′39″W	Category B	30548	Upload Photo
2 Marchmont Road And 1 Warrender Park Terrace				55°56′22″N 3°11′44″W	Category B	30551	Upload another image
10 And 12 Marchmont Road				55°56′21″N 3°11′44″W	Category B	30553	Upload Photo
12 And 13 Marchmont Street				55°56′19″N 3°12′01″W	Category B	30575	Upload Photo
123-129 (Odd Nos) Marchmont Road And 7-10 (Inclusive Nos) Beaufort Road				55°56′06″N 3°11′38″W	Category B	30450	Upload another image
1-8 (Inclusive Nos) Meadow Place And 4, 8, 9, 10, 11, 12, Roseneath Place Including Boundary Walls				55°56′22″N 3°11′37″W	Category B	30452	Upload Photo
1-10 (Inclusive Nos) Millerfield Place				55°56′22″N 3°11′16″W	Category B	30454	Upload Photo
2 Palmerston Road Including Boundary Walls				55°56′10″N 3°11′32″W	Category B	30459	Upload Photo
1A And 1-9 (Inclusive Nos) Rillbank Terrace				55°56′20″N 3°11′20″W	Category B	30462	Upload Photo
11-15 (Odd Nos) Roseneath Terrace				55°56′21″N 3°11′33″W	Category B	30467	Upload another image
Sciennes House Place, Fire Station And Gatepiers				55°56′16″N 3°10′54″W	Category C(S)	30475	Upload another image
Sciennes Road, Royal Hospital For Sick Children Including Mortuary And Mortuary Chapel				55°56′18″N 3°11′20″W	Category B	30480	Upload Photo
9 And 11 Seton Place Including Boundary Walls				55°56′07″N 3°11′01″W	Category B	30481	Upload another image
13 Sylvan Place, Sylvan House, Including Boundary Walls				55°56′19″N 3°11′27″W	Category B	30485	Upload Photo
35 37 And 39 Blackford Road With Boundary Wall Gates And Gatepiers				55°55′56″N 3°11′38″W	Category B	30497	Upload Photo
1-12 Bruntsfield Crescent Boundary Walls And Railings				55°56′10″N 3°12′11″W	Category A	30498	Upload Photo
6-11 (Inclusive Nos) Glenisla Gardens				55°55′38″N 3°11′21″W	Category B	30503	Upload Photo
Grange Loan, Pillar Surmounted By Wyvern Set Into Mutual Wall Between 108-110 (Even Nos) Grange Loan And 2 Lauder Road				55°55′55″N 3°11′04″W	Category B	30381	Upload Photo
186-204 (Even Nos) Grange Loan				55°55′52″N 3°11′26″W	Category C(S)	30385	Upload Photo
1-7 (Inclusive Nos) Grange Road And 128-138 Causewayside				55°56′12″N 3°10′50″W	Category C(S)	30387	Upload Photo
11A, 11B, And 13 Grange Road				55°56′13″N 3°10′56″W	Category C(S)	30388	Upload Photo
60 Grange Road, Superintendent's Lodge To Grange Cemetery				55°56′07″N 3°11′25″W	Category B	30395	Upload another image
Grange Road And Beaufort Road, Edinburgh Southern Cemetery (Grange), Including Boundary Walls, Railings, Gates And Gatepiers				55°56′02″N 3°11′35″W	Category B	30396	Upload another image
1-18 (Inclusive Nos) Grange Terrace				55°55′49″N 3°11′17″W	Category C(S)	30397	Upload Photo
38 Lauder Road				55°56′11″N 3°11′18″W	Category C(S)	30415	Upload Photo
1-6 (Inclusive Nos) Lord Russell Place And 12 Sciennes				55°56′21″N 3°10′56″W	Category B	30422	Upload another image
37 And 37A Mansionhouse Road, Boundary Walls And Railings				55°56′04″N 3°11′18″W	Category B	30426	Upload Photo
30, 30A, 32 And 32A Mansionhouse Road				55°56′04″N 3°11′16″W	Category B	30432	Upload Photo
50-54 (Even Nos) Marchmont Crescent				55°56′14″N 3°11′35″W	Category B	30435	Upload another image
92-104 (Even Nos) Marchmont Crescent				55°56′10″N 3°11′38″W	Category B	30442	Upload another image
83-87 Marchmont Road				55°56′09″N 3°11′38″W	Category B	30444	Upload another image
95-99 (Odd Nos) Marchmont Road				55°56′08″N 3°11′38″W	Category B	30445	Upload another image
5 And 7 (Formerly 14 And 16) Richmond Place, Former Royal Blind Asylum School Workshops				55°56′46″N 3°11′00″W	Category B	30304	Upload Photo
18 Liberton Brae, Liberton Tower Mains, Farmhouse And Steading				55°55′03″N 3°10′08″W	Category B	30305	Upload Photo
3-8 (Inclusive Nos) Trinity Way, Mayfield House And 109 East Trinity Road (Former Lodge), Boundary Walls, Gates And Gatepiers				55°58′30″N 3°12′23″W	Category C(S)	30318	Upload Photo
27-29 Buccleuch Street Including Boundary Wall				55°56′36″N 3°11′04″W	Category B	30320	Upload Photo
39 And 41 Frogston Road West, Princess Margaret Rose Hospital, West Gate Lodge With Gatepiers, Gates And Boundary Walls				55°53′58″N 3°11′49″W	Category C(S)	30327	Upload Photo
41 And 43 Frogston Road West, Princess Margaret Rose Hospital, Nurses' Home				55°54′03″N 3°11′50″W	Category B	30329	Upload Photo
Causewayside And Grange Road, Salisbury Church (Formerly Newington South And Hope Park Church) Including Church Hall And Offices				55°56′13″N 3°10′53″W	Category B	30343	Upload another image
59 Dick Place Including Boundary Walls				55°55′59″N 3°11′32″W	Category C(S)	30356	Upload Photo
48 And 50 Dick Place Including Gatepiers And Boundary Walls				55°55′58″N 3°11′26″W	Category A	30368	Upload Photo
1-7 (Inclusive Nos) Fingal Place, 1 Sylvan Place, And 1 Argyle Place				55°56′22″N 3°11′28″W	Category B	30371	Upload another image
53 Fountainhall Road Including Boundary Wall And Gatepiers				55°55′52″N 3°10′59″W	Category B	30372	Upload Photo
6 Castlelaw Road				55°54′12″N 3°15′33″W	Category B	30226	Upload Photo
Grassmarket, 2 K6 Telephone Kiosks				55°56′51″N 3°11′44″W	Category B	30231	Upload Photo
Great King Street, K6 Telephone Kiosk				55°57′28″N 3°11′59″W	Category B	30249	Upload Photo
11-23 (Odd Nos) Morningside Drive				55°55′27″N 3°12′39″W	Category C(S)	30258	Upload Photo
Cammo Road, Cammo Estate, Stable Block (Off Cammo Walk)				55°57′20″N 3°19′23″W	Category B	30259	Upload Photo
Cammo Road, Cammo Estate, Gatepiers, Railings And Boundary Wall				55°57′34″N 3°19′08″W	Category B	30260	Upload Photo
21-27 Edina Place (Odd Numbers) And 26 Norton Park (Former Edina Works)				55°57′35″N 3°10′11″W	Category B	30271	Upload Photo
100-104 (Even Nos) George Street And 35 Castle Street, Pearl Assurance Building				55°57′09″N 3°12′11″W	Category B	30272	Upload another image
1, 3 And 5 Howdenhall Road				55°54′17″N 3°09′55″W	Category B	30278	Upload Photo
New Market Road, Livestock Sheds				55°55′32″N 3°15′00″W	Category B	30283	Upload Photo
1 And 1A Easter Belmont Road				55°56′55″N 3°15′06″W	Category B	30291	Upload Photo
1-42 (Inclusive Nos) Patriothall				55°57′31″N 3°12′23″W	Category B	30299	Upload Photo
28 And 30 Nicolson Street And 21 Hill Place, The Royal Bank Of Scotland Building				55°56′46″N 3°11′06″W	Category B	30141	Upload another image
20-52 (Even Nos) North Bridge Including Scotsman Hotel, Scotsman Steps, Arcade, Royal Mile Mansions, 175 And 177 High Street And 65-71 (Odd Nos) Cockburn Street				55°57′03″N 3°11′18″W	Category A	30143	Upload another image
St Stephen Street 79-87				55°57′31″N 3°12′21″W	Category B	30172	Upload Photo
102 Trinity Road, Kirtle Lodge, Including Garden House, Boundary Walls And Gatepiers				55°58′40″N 3°12′23″W	Category B	30187	Upload Photo
50 West Port, Former Police And Fire Stations, Including Boundary Wall And Railings				55°56′47″N 3°11′58″W	Category C(S)	30193	Upload Photo
62-76 (Even Nos) West Port, Including 1-32 (Inclusive Nos) Cordiners' Land And Garden Walls And Railings				55°56′47″N 3°12′00″W	Category C(S)	30195	Upload another image
15 Calton Hill				55°57′15″N 3°11′10″W	Category B	30204	Upload Photo
1D And 1E Duddingston Park And 61, 63, 64 - 72 (Inclusive Nos) Park Avenue, Portobello High School Annexe With Retaining Walls, Gates And Gatepiers				55°56′54″N 3°07′07″W	Category B	30207	Upload Photo
160 Lower Granton Road, The Granton Tap				55°58′51″N 3°13′23″W	Category B	30215	Upload Photo
Carrington Road, Fettes College, Kimmerghame House				55°57′41″N 3°13′43″W	Category B	30223	Upload Photo
33 Braehead Drive, Braehead House And Nos 1 And 3 Brae Park Road (Former Service Wing), Including Sundial, Boundary Wall, Gatepiers				55°57′55″N 3°18′37″W	Category B	30054	Upload Photo
6 Bell's Brae				55°57′09″N 3°12′55″W	Category C(S)	30067	Upload Photo
56-60 (Even Nos) Broughton Street, Including Railings				55°57′31″N 3°11′26″W	Category B	30073	Upload Photo
62-66 (Even Nos) Broughton Street, Including Railings				55°57′31″N 3°11′26″W	Category B	30074	Upload Photo
55 And 57 Cockburn Street				55°57′03″N 3°11′21″W	Category B	30083	Upload Photo
18 And 20 Cockburn Street				55°57′02″N 3°11′24″W	Category B	30087	Upload Photo

== Key ==
The scheme for classifying buildings in Scotland is:

- Category A: "buildings of national or international importance, either architectural or historic; or fine, little-altered examples of some particular period, style or building type."
- Category B: "buildings of regional or more than local importance; or major examples of some particular period, style or building type, which may have been altered."
- Category C: "buildings of local importance; lesser examples of any period, style, or building type, as originally constructed or moderately altered; and simple traditional buildings which group well with other listed buildings."

In March 2016 there were 47,288 listed buildings in Scotland. Of these, 8% were Category A, and 50% were Category B, with the remaining 42% being Category C.

== See also ==
- List of listed buildings in Edinburgh
