= Jock Wilson =

Jock Wilson may refer to:

- Jock Wilson (British Army soldier) (1903–2008), British serviceman and oldest D-Day veteran
- Jock Wilson (Scottish footballer) (1870–?), Scottish footballer
- Jock Wilson (English footballer) (1894–1957), English footballer
- Jock Wilson (footballer, born 1916) (1916–2010), Scottish footballer, see List of Oldham Athletic A.F.C. players (25–99 appearances)
- Jock Wilson (police officer) (1922–1993), British police officer

== See also ==
- John Wilson (disambiguation)
