= Museum of Gothenburg =

- Göteborgs stadsmuseum
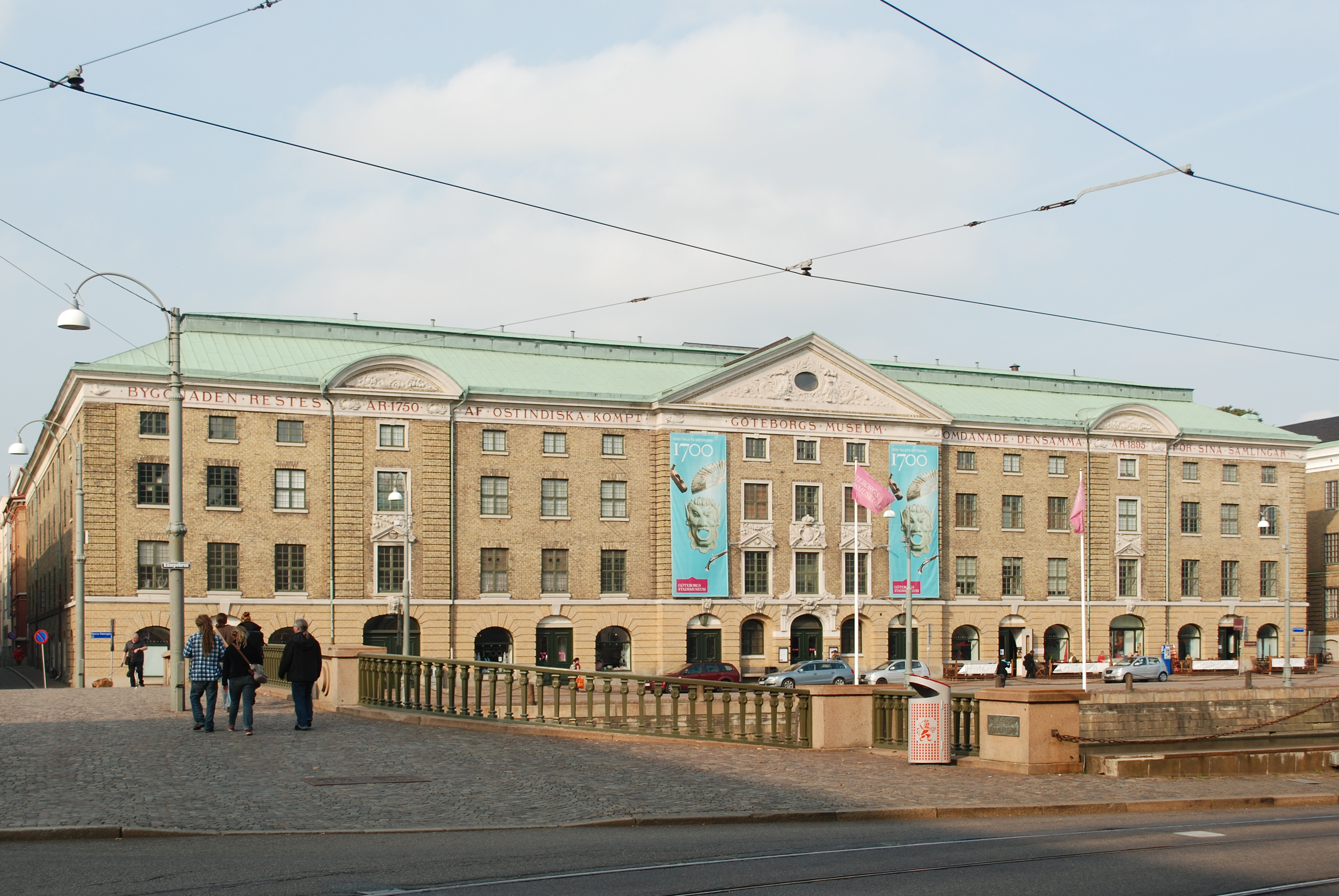

- Location within Västra Götaland
- Established: 1861; 165 years ago
- Coordinates: 57°42′23″N 11°57′48″E
- Type: History museum
- Website: goteborgsstadsmuseum.se/en/

The Museum of Gothenburg (Swedish: Göteborgs stadsmuseum) is a local history museum located in the city centre of Gothenburg in western Sweden. It is located in the East India House (Swedish: Ostindiska huset), originally built as the Swedish East India Company offices in 1762. The city museum was established in 1861.

The City Museum is a cultural history museum. It displays Gothenburg and West Sweden's history, from the Viking Age to the present day. There is a permanent exhibition about the Swedish East India Company.

== History ==
The museum was founded in the East India House in 1861. Modelled on the Victoria and Albert Museum in London, it initially comprised natural history, art and books and covered art, science and industry. Its founders were Sven Adolf Hedlund, AF Ericsson, August Malm and Victor von Gegerfelt. The merchant John West Wilson paid for a fourth wing which opened in May 1891 shortly after his death.

At the time of the Gothenburg Exhibition in 1923 the city's collections were split in two, with the art housed in the Gothenburg Museum of Art and the rest in the Gothenburg Natural History Museum. Between 1993 and 1996, several of the city's museums on archaeology, general history and the history of industry, education and theatre merged to form the Gothenburg City Museum.
