= Logic and Sexual Morality =

1965 book by John Boyd Wilson

- Author: John Boyd Wilson
- Language: English
- Subject: sexual ethics
- Publisher: Penguin Books
- Publication date: 1965
- Media type: Print
- ISBN: 0751201014 (1993 revised edition)

Logic and Sexual Morality is a 1965 book by John Boyd Wilson in which the author provides a critique of philosophical arguments about sex.

== Reception ==
The book was reviewed by John C. Hall and David Sladen.
