= Jack Wilson =

Jack or Jackie Wilson may refer to:

== Entertainment ==
- Jack Wilson (1894–1970), vaudeville actor, part of Wilson, Keppel and Betty
- Jack Wilson (pianist) (1907–2006), British jazz pianist from Warwickshire, England
- Jackie Wilson (1934–1984), American soul and R&B singer
- Jack Wilson (jazz pianist) (1936–2007), American jazz pianist from Chicago
- Jack Wilson (writer) (1937–1997), Northern Irish novelist
- Jack Wilson (Home and Away), a character in the Australian soap opera Home and Away

== Sports ==
- Jack Wilson (Yorkshire cricketer) (1889–1959), British cricketer, World War I pilot, and jockey
- Jack Wilson (footballer) (1897–?), English footballer
- Jackie Wilson (boxer) (1909–1966), American boxer
- Jack Wilson (pitcher) (1912–1995), pitcher in baseball
- Jack Wilson (rower) (1914–1997), British rower and Olympic champion in 1948
- Jack Wilson (halfback) (1917–2001), first-round pick of the Cleveland Rams in 1942
- Jack Wilson (boxer) (1918–1956), American boxer and Olympic medalist in 1936
- Jack Wilson (Australian cricketer) (1921–1985), Australian cricketer
- Jack Wilson (basketball) (1936–1986), American college basketball player and high school basketball coach
- Jack Wilson (shortstop) (born 1977), American baseball player
- Jack Wilson (rugby union) (born 1989), New Zealand rugby union player
- Jack Wilson (offensive lineman) (born 1999), American college football and basketball player

== Other ==
- Wovoka (1856–1932), Northern Paiute Indian prophet also known as Jack Wilson
- Jack Wilson (engineer) (1905–1972), English-Australian engineer and founder of Wilson Transformers
- Jack M. Wilson (born 1945), president of the University of Massachusetts
- Jack Wilson (judge) (born 1978/9), American judge
- Jack Wilson (political advisor) (born 1996), Britain's youngest senior political advisor as of 2017
- Jack Wilson (born c. 1948), American elderly security guard who single-handedly ended the West Freeway Church of Christ shooting

== See also ==
- Jocky Wilson (1950–2012), Scottish professional darts player
- John Wilson (disambiguation)
- Johnny Wilson (disambiguation)
