= Jonathan Wilson =

Jonathan Wilson may refer to:

- Jonathan Wilson (musician) (born 1974), American psychedelic folk musician
- Jonathan Wilson (writer) (born 1976), British sports journalist and author
- Jonathan Wilson (actor) (active since 1990), Canadian actor and playwright
- Jonathan Wilson (author) (active since 1994), British-born writer and professor
- Jonathan Wilson (fighter) (born 1987), American mixed martial artist
- Dana Wilson (rugby league) (Jonathan Wilson, 1983–2011), rugby player from Cook Islands
- Jonathan Wilson, former member of the band Eisley
- Jonathan M. Wilson (~1796–1871?), American slave trader

== See also ==
- John Wilson (disambiguation)
- Johnny Wilson (disambiguation)
- Jonathan Wilson-Hartgrove, Christian writer and preacher
