= Joseph B. Campbell =

American politician

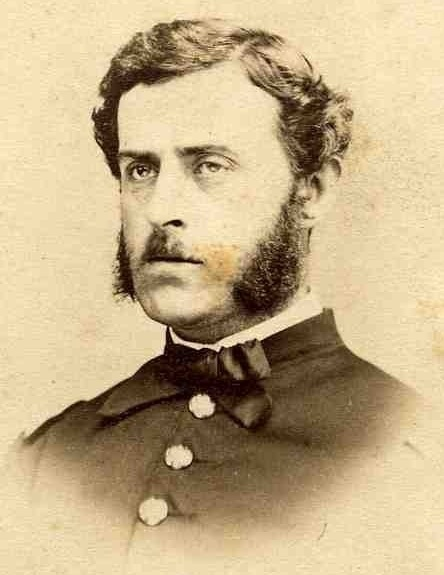
- Campbell c. 1860

7th Commander of the Department of Alaska
- In office August 17, 1874 – June 14, 1876
- President: Ulysses S. Grant
- Preceded by: George B. Rodney Jr.
- Succeeded by: John Mendenhall

Military service
- Allegiance: United States
- Branch/service: United States Army; Union Army
- Years of service: 1861-1891
- Rank: Captain
- Commands: Department of Alaska

Joseph Boyd Campbell (1833 or 1836 – 28 August 1891), son of Henry Roe Campbell and Sidney Boyd, was an officer in the United States Army who served as the seventh commander of the Department of Alaska, from August 17, 1874, to June 14, 1876.

Campbell in West Point uniform, 1861

Boyd graduated from West Point in June 1861 and was commissioned as a 1st lieutenant. After being wounded in the Battle of Antietam, he served as aide-de-camp to William F. Barry from 1862 until 1864. He was promoted to captain in February 1867. Boyd commanded Fort Foote from 1870 to 1872, Fort Warren from 1888 to 1889, and Jackson Barracks from 1889 to 1891.

Boyd was sent on sick leave in May 1891 and died in Montreal a few months later. He was buried in Beaver, Pennsylvania.

== See also ==
- List of governors of Alaska
