= Carol Espy-Wilson =

African American Electrical Engineer

- Born: Carol Yvonne Espy c. 1957 (age 68–69); Atlanta, Georgia
- Education: Stanford University (BS); Massachusetts Institute of Technology (MS, PhD)
- Spouse: John Silvanus Wilson, Jr.
- Children: 3
- Scientific career
- Fields: Electrical Engineering
- Workplaces: University of Maryland, College Park
- Thesis: An acoustic-phonetic approach to speech recognition: application to the semivowels (1987)
- Doctoral advisor: Kenneth N. Stevens

Carol Yvonne Espy-Wilson (born c. 1957) is an electrical engineer and Professor of Electrical and Computer Engineering at the University of Maryland (UMD) at College Park. She received her Ph.D. in Electrical Engineering from the Massachusetts Institute of Technology in 1987.

== Early life and education ==
Carol Yvonne Espy was born in c. 1957 in Atlanta, Georgia. She is the youngest of four children born to Mattie and Matthew Espy. Espy-Wilson attributes much of her success to her family. Espy-Wilson's family had high expectations for all the children, and Espy-Wilson was expected to toe the line.

Calvin, seven years older brother, was Espy-Wilson's role model and advisor. Starting when she was five years old, Calvin would try to teach her the math he was learning in school. When Calvin graduated from Georgia Tech in Electrical Engineering, Espy-Wilson decided to major in Electrical Engineering, as well. Calvin graduated from Stanford University with his MS degree in Electrical Engineering and brought an application from Stanford home to Espy-Wilson and made sure that she filled it out when it was time for her to apply to schools. Espy-Wilson decided to attend Stanford University and majored in Electrical Engineering, she obtained her BS degree from Stanford University in 1979.

She decided to continue her studies at Massachusetts Institute of Technology (MIT) for graduate school and obtained her MS degree in Electrical Engineering in 1981. Her master's thesis was entitled, “Effects of Noise in Signal Reconstruction from its Fourier Transform Phase”. Espy-Wilson received her “Electrical Engineer (EE)” degree from MIT in 1984. She received her Ph.D. in 1987 advised by Kenneth Stevens. Her doctoral dissertation was entitled, “An Acoustic-Phonetic Approach to Speech Recognition: Application to the Semivowels”.

== Career ==
After receiving her Ph.D., Espy-Wilson continued her affiliation with MIT, first as a post-doctoral student and then as a research scientist and visiting scientist. She was on faculty at Boston University from 1990 to 2001 and is Professor in the Electrical and Computer Engineering Department at the University of Maryland, College Park. She directs the Speech Communication Lab at UMD. Espy-Wilson is the "[f]irst African American woman, and first African American, in the Department of Electrical & Computer Engineering, to achieve tenure & be promoted to Full Professor" at the University of Maryland.

Espy-Wilson's research interests include: "the integration of engineering, linguistics and speech acoustics to study speech communication. She is developing an approach to speech recognition based on phonetic features, articulatory parameters and landmarks to better address variability in the speech signal. She also conducts research in the areas of speech production, speech enhancement, speaker recognition, single-channel speaker separation and language and genre detection in audio content analysis and forensics. A major focus of her research is to gain a better understanding of the relationship between articulation, acoustics and perception and to use this knowledge to develop effective speech technologies".

Espy-Wilson is the founder of OmniSpeech, a start-up that offers technology to improve sound quality over cell phones and in hearing aids, among other devices.

In 2008-2009, Espy-Wilson was named a Sargent-Faull Fellow at Harvard Radcliffe Institute, with a "focus on the noise robustness of a probabilistic landmark-based speech-recognition system." In 2022, she was named an IEEE Fellow, "for contributions to speech enhancement and recognition".

== Personal ==
Espy-Wilson is married to John Silvanus Wilson Jr., who is the 11th President of Morehouse College in Atlanta and former Executive Director of the White House Initiative on Historically Black Colleges and Universities (HBCU's).

Together they have three children, two daughters and a son. Their two twin daughters, Ayana and Ashia, are 2011 alumnae of Stanford University and Harvard University, respectively. Their son, John "Jay" Sylvanus Wilson, III, is an alumnus of Princeton University.
