= Johnny Wilson =

Johnny Wilson may refer to:

- John H. Wilson (Hawaii politician) (1871–1956), Mayor of Honolulu nicknamed Johnny
- Johnny Wilson (boxer) (1893–1985), American boxer
- Johnny Wilson (American football, born 1915) (1915–2002), from Ohio, played for the Cleveland Rams in the NFL
- Jumping Johnny Wilson (1927–2019), American basketball and baseball player
- Johnny Wilson (ice hockey) (1929–2011), Canadian ice hockey player and coach
- Johnny Wilson (wide receiver) (born 2001), American football player

== See also ==
- Johnnie E. Wilson (born 1944), retired United States Army four-star general

== See also ==
- Jack Wilson (disambiguation)
- John Wilson (disambiguation)
- Jonathan Wilson (disambiguation)
