= John Skinner Wilson =

John Skinner Wilson is the name of:

- John Skinner Wilson (Provost) (1849–1926), Anglican priest
- John Skinner Wilson (rugby union) (1884–1916), Scotland rugby player
- J. S. Wilson (1888–1969), Colonel John Skinner "Belge" Wilson, Scottish Scouting luminary and friend of General Baden-Powell

== See also ==
- John Wilson (disambiguation)
