= Mortonhall Crematorium =

Architectural structure in City of Edinburgh, Scotland

Coordinates: 55.9024°N 3.1704°W

The Mortonhall Crematorium is a multi-denominational crematorium in Edinburgh, Scotland. It is an example of Basil Spence's post-war expressionist style. Opened in 1967, the crematorium is set in mature woodland and is a Category A listed building. A walled memorial garden opened there in December 2015.

== Design ==
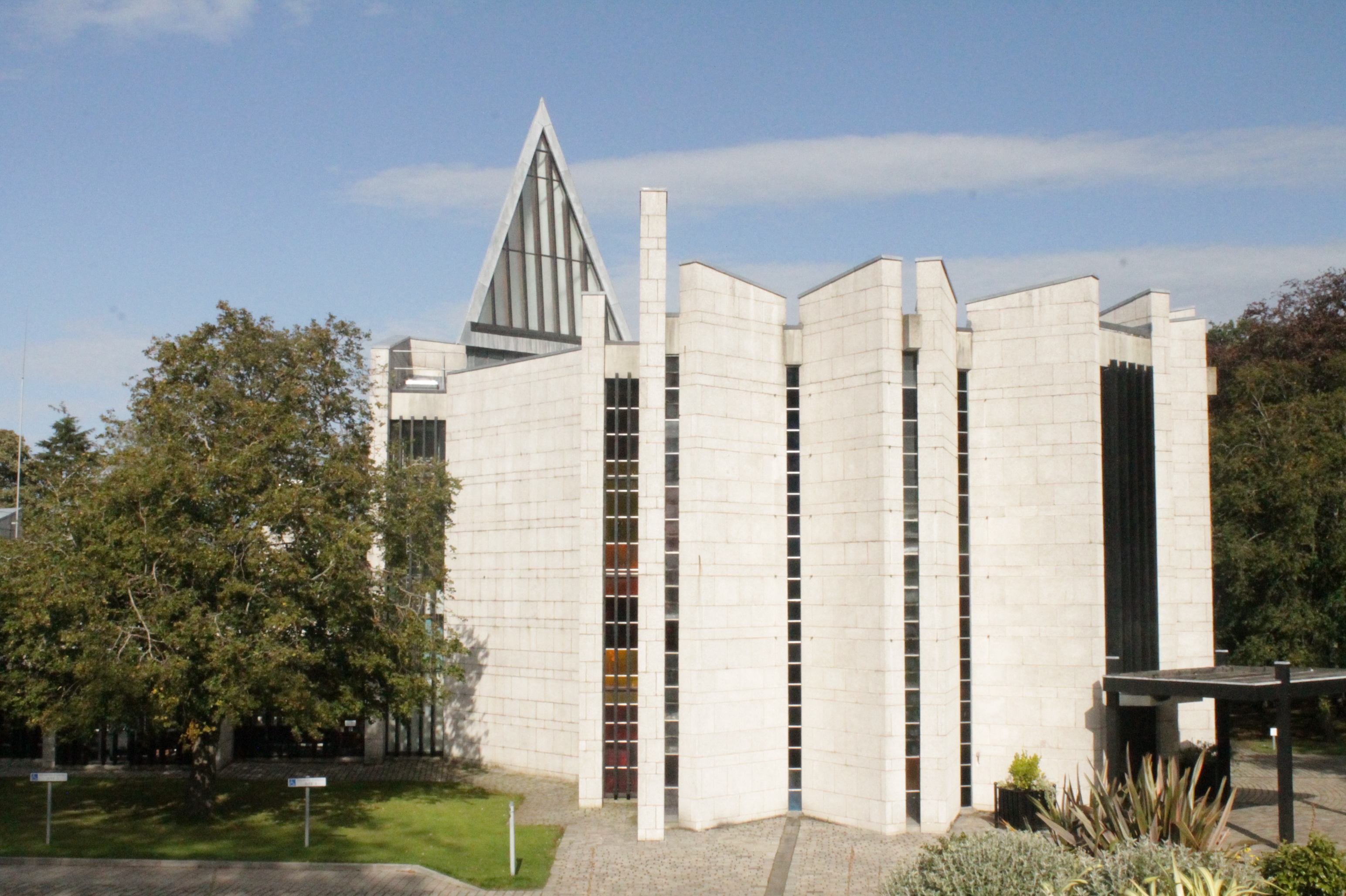
Main chapel, Mortonhall Crematorium

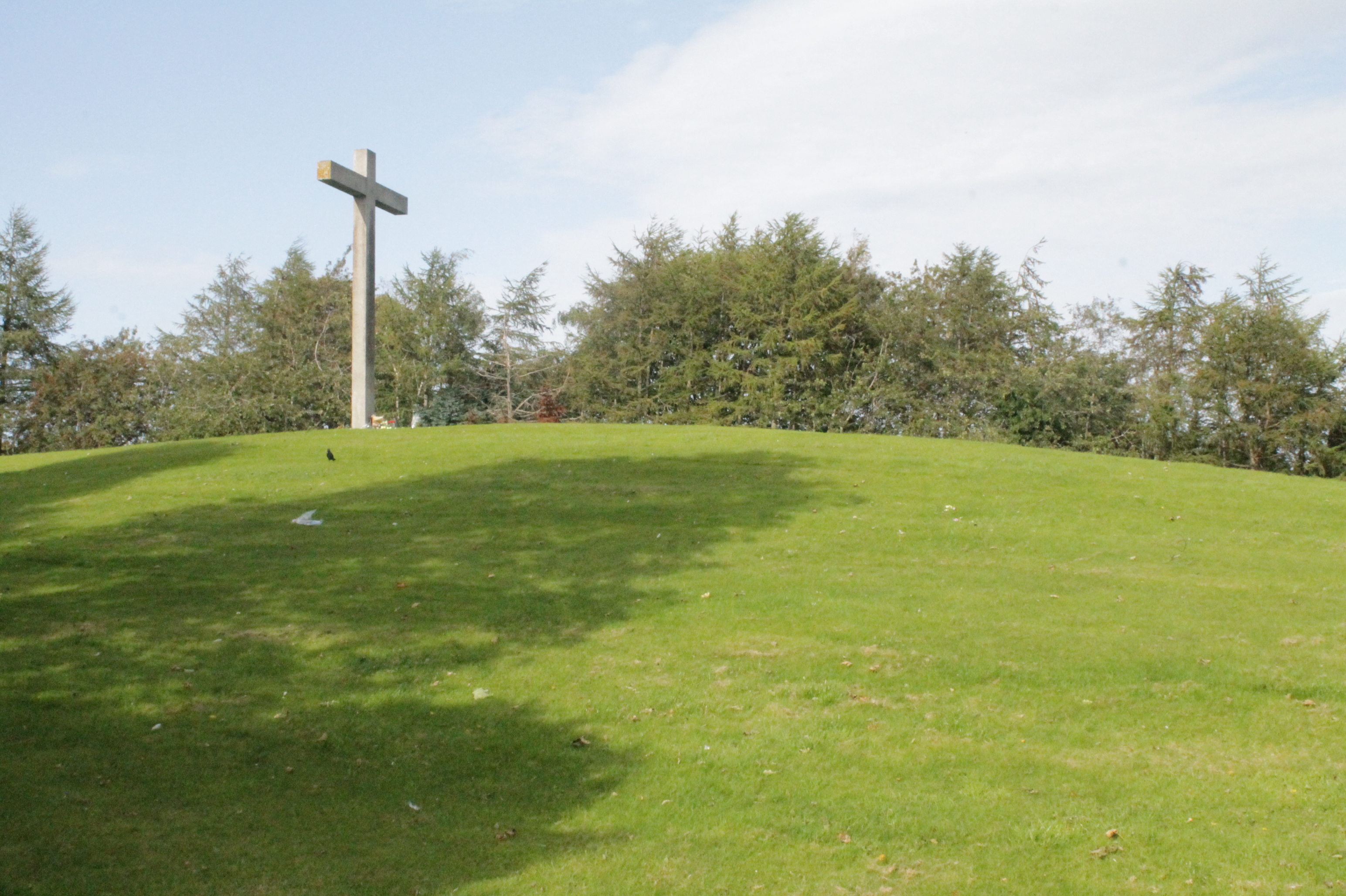
Garden of Remembrance, Mortonhall Crematorium

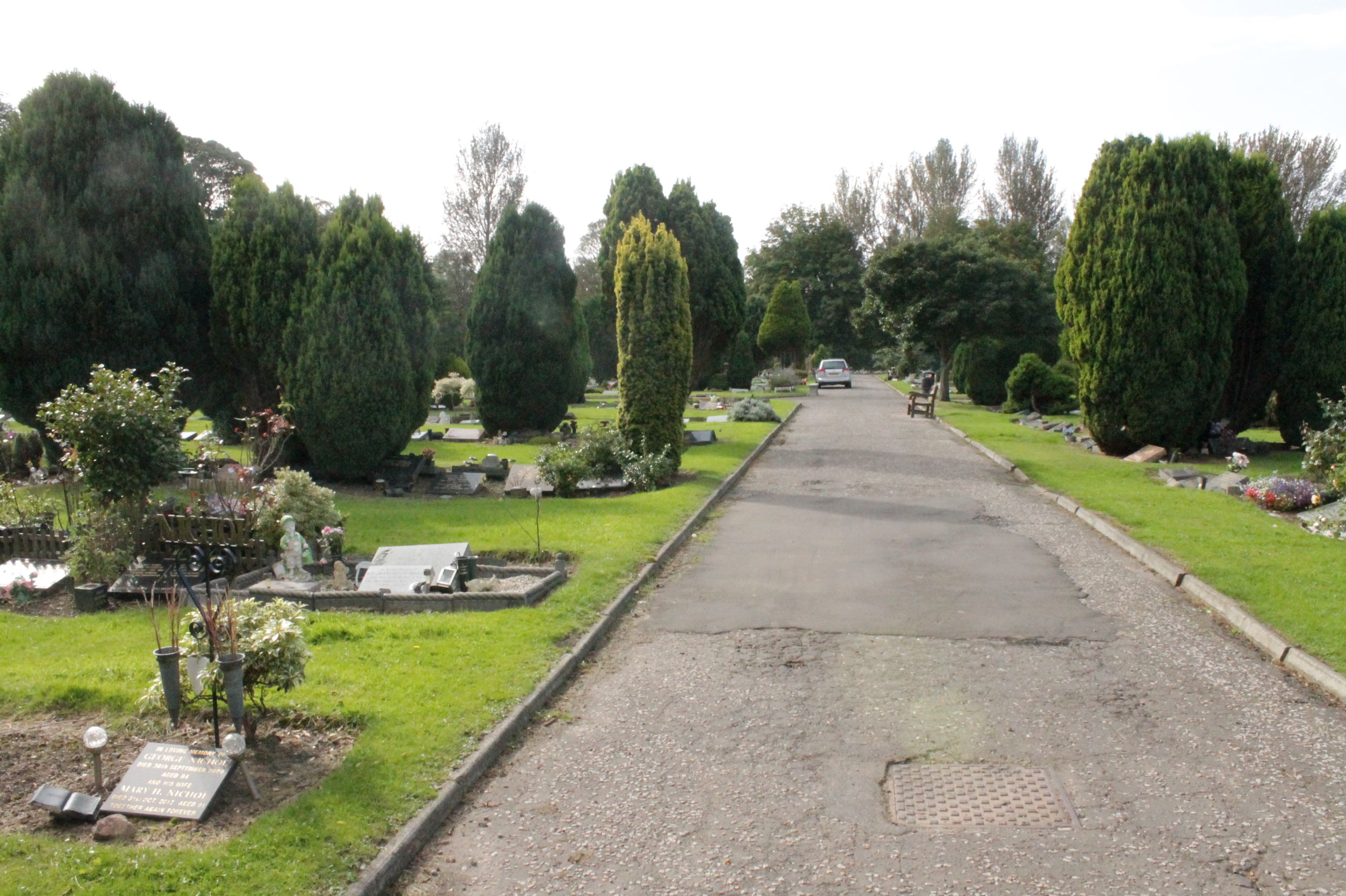
Mortonhall Cemetery, Edinburgh

Architects Spence, Glover and Ferguson were commissioned by Edinburgh City Council in 1960 to build a new multi-denominational crematorium. The project is a smaller and more refined version of Spence's earlier project at Coventry Cathedral. The project architect was John 'Archie' Dewar. The City of Edinburgh also had architect Alexander Steele work on the project. The crematorium design was published in the Architects' Journal in May 1962. The main chapel has seating for 250 people and the smaller Pentland Chapel seats 50.

The main chapel was built at an angle that could maximise the natural light. The windows are tall, glazed slits. The walls are constructed from white calcined flint aggregate concrete blocks in three sizes arranged to give a distinctive pattern. The chapel has tall, angled fins that provide dramatic shapes. The use of light and colour has been compared to the effects seen in Coventry Cathedral, also designed by Spence. From the main buildings a simple concrete cross can be seen, positioned on a small hill, a feature copied from Gunnar Asplund's Woodland Crematorium in Stockholm. Overall the crematorium design achieves 'calmly expressionist forms'. The design stands out from the other 250 or so crematoria across the UK.

On 7 February 1967 a service was held to dedicate the chapels. The Crematorium was listed as a category A building in April 1996. In 2005, the crematorium appeared in the list of 100 best modern Scottish buildings published in the architectural journal Prospect. It was one of five buildings designed by Spence that appeared in a list of the top 100 architectural works from the past century, compiled by the Royal Incorporation of Architects in Scotland (RIAS).

== Mortonhall Ashes Scandal ==
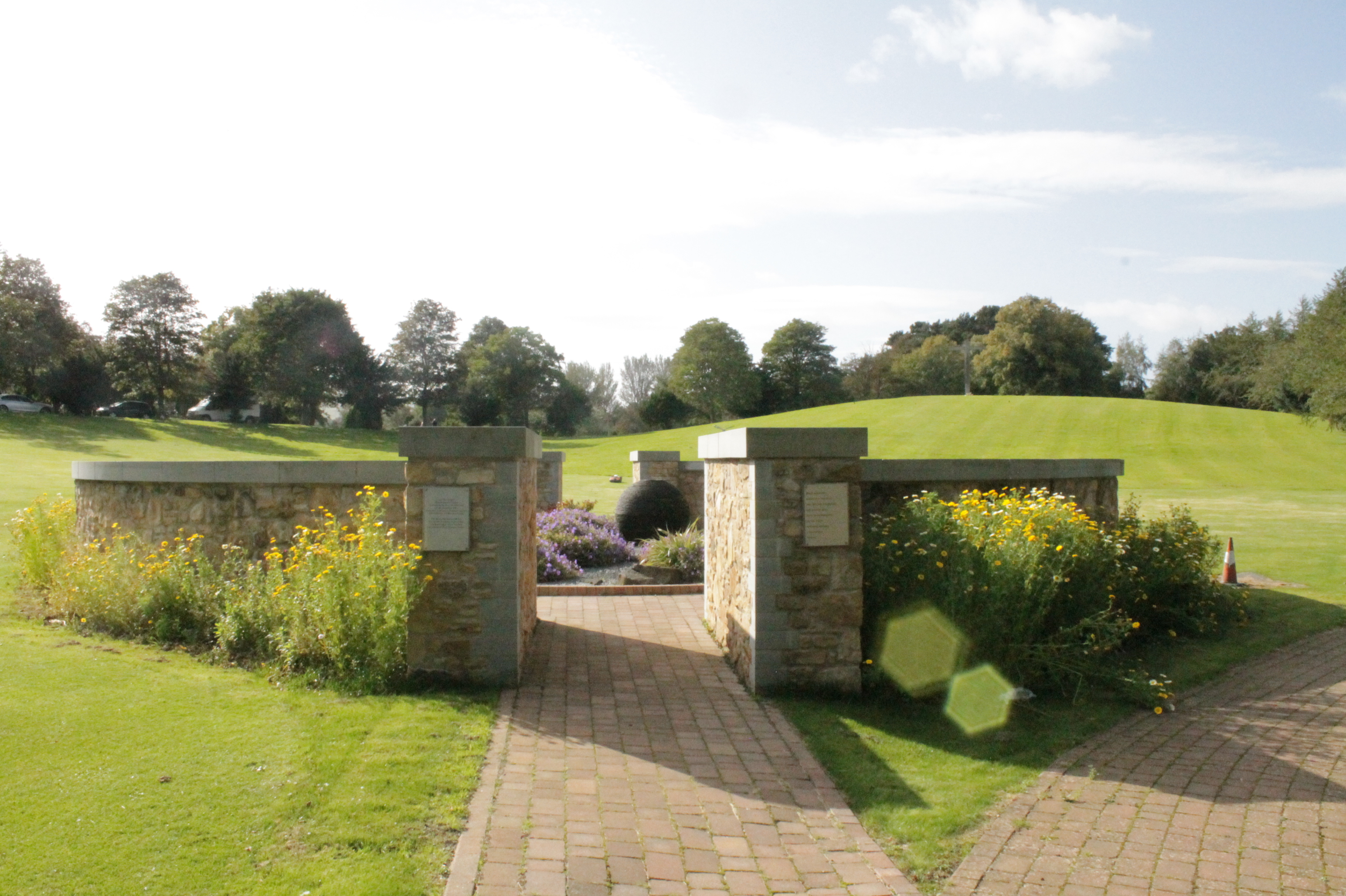
Memorial Garden, Mortonhall Crematorium

Scottish burial law requires that all stillborns are buried rather than cremated. In Edinburgh, Rosebank Cemetery is used for this purpose. The same law requires that parents are responsible for the burial of their child. However, a grey area appeared for children dying in hospital during the first few days. NHS Scotland (Edinburgh) introduced a protocol that these deaths would be dealt with by the NHS and Edinburgh Council, to avoid stress to the parents. No charge was made to the parents for this service. Prior to 1970, this resulted in burial of the remains, but following the construction of Mortonhall (as the first Council-owned crematorium in Edinburgh) the law permitted these to be cremated.

In 2012, it emerged (through a freelance journalist) that the ashes of babies who had died shortly after birth had not been returned to parents. Staff at the crematorium had disposed of these ashes in the Garden of Remembrance without informing parents. They later told parents that no ashes were left when young babies were cremated. An inquiry was held into the failings, which found that the families of over 250 babies were affected. Findings of the inquiry were published in April 2014. A settlement scheme was announced in January 2015, with the council offering up to £4,000 to families who had been affected.

In January 2015, four draft designs for a permanent memorial were unveiled, with affected parents asked to give their views. A design was selected that featured a garden planted with trees and containing a stone water feature. A pond had been proposed in the original design but this was replaced with the stone water feature. The walled garden opened in December 2015. It has plaques installed on which the names of 149 babies and infants are recorded.

The Burial and Cremation (Scotland) Act 2016 now clarifies protocols.

In February 2019, a second memorial was unveiled in the form of a baby elephant in Princes Street Gardens.

== Notable cremations ==
- Sir Reginald Graham (1892-1980), World War I Victoria Cross recipient
- Johnny Haynes (1934-2005), professional footballer
- Jock Wilson (1903-2008), centenarian British Army veteran of D-Day landings

== See also ==
- DoCoMoMo Key Scottish Monuments
- List of Category A listed buildings in Edinburgh
- List of post-war Category A listed buildings in Scotland
- Prospect 100 best modern Scottish buildings
