= John Wilson (footballer, born 1934) =

English footballer

Personal information
- Full name: John Christopher Wilson
- Date of birth: 28 October 1934 (age 92)
- Place of birth: Norwich, England
- Position: Full back

Senior career*
Years	Team	Apps	(Gls)
1953–1959	Norwich City	47	(0)
1959–1960	Chesterfield	16	(0)
1960–1962	King's Lynn		
Total		63	(0)
- * Club domestic league appearances and goals

John Christopher Wilson (born 28 October 1934) was an English professional footballer who played in the Football League as a full back.
