= W. Hasell Wilson =

American railroad engineer (1811–1902)

William Hasell Wilson
- Born: 5 November 1811; Charleston, Charleston, South Carolina, United States
- Died: 17 August 1902 (aged 90); United States
- Occupations: surveyor, civil engineer, Railroad executive
- Father: John Wilson

Notes
- Wilson's son, Joseph M. Wilson(1838–1902), was also a civil engineer for the Pennsylvania Railroad.

William Hasell Wilson (1811–1902) was a prominent American surveyor and civil engineer for both the Reading and Pennsylvania Railroads in the 19th century. Two of his sons, Joseph Miller Wilson (1838–1902) and Henry W. Wilson (1844–1910) went on to found Wilson Brothers & Company a prominent Victorian-era architecture and engineering firm established in Philadelphia, Pennsylvania, that was especially noted for its structural expertise.

== Early life and works ==
Wilson was the resident engineer in charge for the 1835 Black Rock Tunnel, the second rail road tunnel constructed in the United States, and the oldest tunnel still in use.

Wilson was born in Charleston, South Carolina in 1811 to John Wilson (1789–1833) and Eliza Gibbes, his wife, daughter of William Hasell Gibbes of Charleston, South Carolina, and his wife, Elizabeth Allston, who was a half sister of Washington Allston, painter and poet. Wilson was a lineal descendant of the Allstons and Gibbes families, two of the oldest names which date back to the founding of the colony in the Seventeenth Century. On his father's side he was descended from a long line of civil engineers, and his father (Major John Wilson) was the Chief Engineer of the Pennsylvania State Railway. Wilson married Jane Millers of Delaware Co., Pa., *(Born 26 April 1836, died. 11 May 1898)

He died in 1902 and was buried at Laurel hill cemetery in Philadelphia, Pennsylvania.

His son, Joseph Miller Wilson (1838–1902), was also a civil engineer for the Pennsylvania Railroad.

== Works ==
- Notes on the Philadelphia and Columbia Railroad, W. Hassell Wilson Journal of The Franklin Institute (May 1840), vol. 29, pp. 331–341.
- A brief review of railroad history from the earliest period to the year 1894. Allen, Lane & Scott. 1895. pp. 53.
- Reminiscences of a Railroad Engineer. Railroad World Publishing Company, 1896.
