= John Wilson (New South Wales cricketer) =

Australian cricketer (born 1947)

Personal information
- Born: 1 September 1947 (age 77); Sydney, Australia
- Source: ESPNcricinfo, 8 February 2017

John Wilson (born 1 September 1947) is an Australian cricketer. He played twelve first-class and three List A matches for New South Wales between 1968/69 and 1971/72.

== See also ==
- List of New South Wales representative cricketers
