= John Wilson (footballer, born 1952) =

English footballer

Personal information
- Full name: John Allan Wilson
- Date of birth: 11 April 1952
- Place of birth: Jarrow, England
- Position: Midfielder

Senior career*
Years	Team	Apps	(Gls)
- Consett
1971–1973	Darlington	20	(1)
- Gateshead
- * Club domestic league appearances and goals

John Wilson (born 11 April 1952) is an English former footballer who played as a midfielder in the Football League for Darlington and in non-league football for Consett and Gateshead. After nursing an injury, he became a part time footballer alongside his career. His daughter, Emma Wilson was born in 1977 and he is now the Grandfather to Eve Coates, Amelia Coates and Isla Wilson.
