= John Wilson (Tasmania cricketer) =

Australian cricketer

Personal information
- Born: 27 November 1868; Westbury, Tasmania, Australia
- Died: 24 July 1906 (aged 37); Launceston, Tasmania, Australia

Domestic team information
- Years: Team
- 1889: Tasmania
- Source: Cricinfo, 14 January 2016

John Wilson (27 November 1868 – 24 July 1906) was an Australian cricketer. He played one first-class match for Tasmania in 1889.

== See also ==
- List of Tasmanian representative cricketers
