= John Wilson (philosopher, born 1928) =

Philosopher of education (1928-2003)

John Boyd Wilson (6 October 1928 - 29 August 2003) was a British philosopher of education and a pioneer of modern moral education in western Europe. Wilson also promoted the relevance of conceptual analysis as a useful tool for people in general (see book Thinking with Concepts).

== Books ==
- Public Schools and Private Practice (George Allen & Unwin, 1962)
- Logic and Sexual Morality (Penguin, 1965)
- Equality (Hutchinson, 1966)
- Introduction to Moral Education, with two more authors (Penguin Books, 1969)
- Thinking with Concepts (Cambridge University Press, 1970)
- Education in Religion and the Emotions (Heinemann, 1971)
- Philosophy and Religion: The Logic of Religious Belief (Greenwood Pub Group, 1979)
- Fantasy and Common Sense in Education (Martin Robertson, 1979)
- Discipline And Moral Education: A survey of public opinion and understanding (NFER-Nelson, 1981)
- Moral Education and the Curriculum (Pergamon Press, 1969)
- Moral Thinking
- Practical Methods of Moral Education
- Values and Moral Development in Higher Education (Croom Helm, 1974)
- Preface to the philosophy of education (Routledge & Kegan Paul, 1979)
- Reason and Morals (Cambridge University Press, 1969)
- What Philosophy Can Do (Palgrave Macmillan, 1986)
