= John Wilson (Scottish mathematician) =

Scottish mathematician and physicist (1847–1896)

Rev John Wilson FRSE FEIS (1847–1896) was a Scottish mathematician and physicist.

== Life ==
Wilson was born in Montrose on 21 November 1847. In his youth he moved to Bannockburn, where his father, James Wilson, opened the "James Wilson School". He was educated at his father's school). He then studied mathematics and natural philosophy at the University of Edinburgh graduating with an MA around 1866. He then trained as a Free Church minister at New College, Edinburgh, but instead of joining the ministry, returned to his father's school to teach.

Apart from teaching at the school, where he replaced his father as Rector, he taught mathematics in nearby Stirling as an evening course. His father's school was rebranded as Bannockburn Academy.

In 1878 he was elected a Fellow of the Royal Society of Edinburgh. His proposers were Philip Kelland, James Sime, Thomas Graham Balfour and Peter Guthrie Tait.

He joined the Edinburgh Mathematical Society in 1885 and served as its Treasurer from 1888 to 1895 and President in 1896. With an enduring love of the church he served on the Home Mission work in Edinburgh and was both a church elder and session clerk.

In 1887 his school was taken over by the local council following the Education (Scotland) Act 1872. He then moved to Edinburgh, living at 27 Buccleuch Place near George Square.

He died on 8 December 1896, following a few days illness, at 23 Buccleuch Place in Edinburgh. He was unmarried. His obituary was written by Cargill Gilston Knott.

== Publications ==
- Notes on Physics and Natural Philosophy
- On Parallel Motions (1878)
