= John Wilson (civil servant, born 1915) =

British civil servant

Sir John Martindale Wilson, KCB (3 September 1915 – 26 July 1993) was a British civil servant.

Born in Madras, he was educated at Bradfield College and Gonville and Caius College, Cambridge, and entered the Department of Agriculture for Scotland before moving to the Ministry of Supply in 1939. He served in the Royal Artillery during the Second World War, returning to the Ministry of Supply in 1945. He was in the Cabinet Office during the Suez Crisis. He served at the Ministry of Defence (1958–61) and then the Ministry of Aviation (1961–65) before returning to the new Ministry of Defence in 1965 as a deputy secretary; he was Second Permanent Secretary with responsibility for administration from 1972 to 1975.

Wilson served as chairman of the Crown Housing Association from 1975 to 1978 and then chaired the Civil Service Appeal Board from 1978 to 1981. He was a vice-president of the Civil Service Retirement Fellowship from 1982. He was appointed a Companion of the Order of the Bath in 1960 and promoted to Knight Commander in 1974.

Government offices
Preceded by Sir Arthur Drew	Second Permanent Secretary of the Ministry of Defence (Administration); 1972–1975	Succeeded by Sir William Geraghty
