= John Wilson (sport shooter) =

Dutch sport shooter

Personal information
- Born: 1 September 1879 Bennebroek, North Holland, Netherlands
- Died: 15 March 1940 (aged 60) Amsterdam, North Holland, Netherlands

Sport
- Sport: Sports shooting

John Waterloo Wilson (1 September 1879 – 15 March 1940) was a Dutch sport shooter who competed at the 1908 Summer Olympics.

He was born in Bennebroek and died in Amsterdam.

In 1908, he finished fourth with the Dutch team in the team trap shooting event. He finished seventh in the individual trap competition.

The city of Brussels has a street named Rue John Waterloo Wilson after his grandfather John W. Wilson, who left 27 paintings to the City of Brussels.
