= John Silvanus Wilson =

American academic administrator

John Silvanus Wilson, Jr.
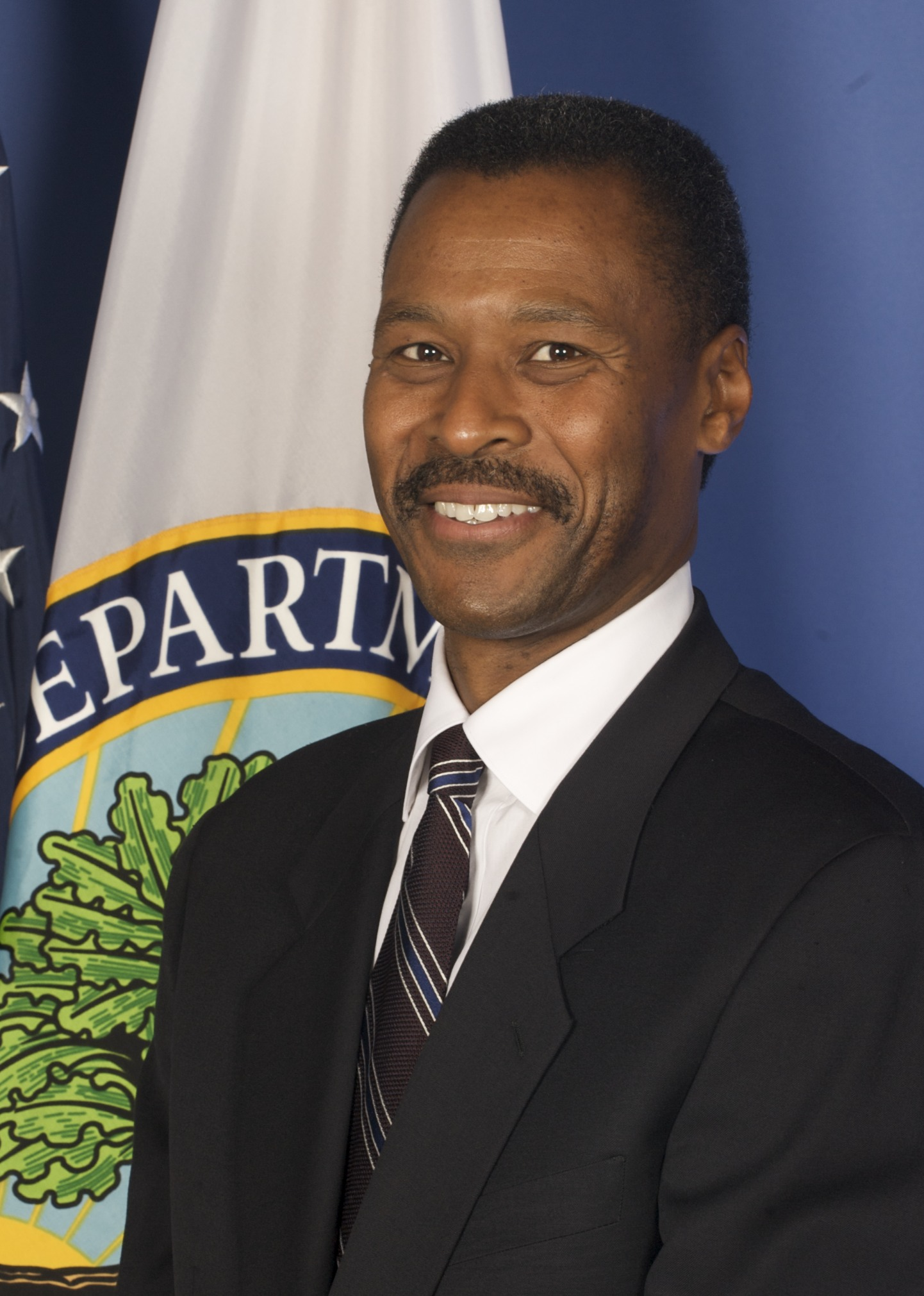

11th President of Morehouse College
- In office January 2013 – March 2017
- Preceded by: Robert Michael Franklin, Jr.
- Succeeded by: William J. Taggart

Personal details
- Spouse: Carol Espy-Wilson
- Children: 3
- Education: Morehouse College (BBA); Harvard University (MTh, MEd, PhD)
- Profession: Academic administrator

John Silvanus Wilson, Jr. is an American academic administrator who served as the 11th president of Morehouse College from 2013 to 2017. Before returning to lead his alma mater in 2013, Wilson served in the United States Department of Education, at George Washington University, and the Massachusetts Institute of Technology.

== Early life and education ==
John Silvanus Wilson, Jr. was born and raised in Philadelphia. His father was a clergyman who graduated from Virginia Union University. His mother, a teacher, graduated from Morgan State University.

Wilson attended Morehouse College and earned a Bachelor of Arts degree in 1979, majoring in business with a minor in religion and philosophy. While at Morehouse he was initiated into Kappa Alpha Psi fraternity in the fall of 1976 through the fraternity’s Pi chapter. He was then accepted in graduate programs at Harvard University and pursued a master's degree in theology (1981), a master's degree in education (1982), and a doctorate in education (1985). He concentrated his doctoral studies on education administration, planning, and social policy.

== Career ==
Wilson was an administrator at the Massachusetts Institute of Technology (MIT) from 1984 until 2000, becoming its Director of Foundation Relations and Assistant Provost. During this time, he also served as a teaching fellow at Harvard in their African American Studies program, and in the Graduate School of Education.

In 2001, Wilson was named the Executive Dean of the George Washington University's (GWU) Virginia campus. GWU appointed him an Associate Professor of Higher Education in 2006.

In the presidential administration of U.S. President Barack Obama, Wilson was named to head the White House Initiative on Historically Black Colleges and Universities. Beginning in 2009, he served as a liaison between higher education institutions and the federal government.

Wilson was appointed the 11th president of Morehouse College in 2012. Morehouse is the only college in the United States that provides men only liberal arts college education, with focus on African Americans.

While at MIT, Wilson was the head of the Boston area Morehouse alumni association and received the college's Benjamin Elijah Mays Leadership Award in 1998. Wilson has served on the governing boards of Spelman College, the Andover Newton Theological School, and The Samaritans. He has also served on the advisory board of the Kresge Foundation and as a consultant to the United Negro College Fund.

On September 2, 2025, he began a new role as the Executive Director of the McGraw Center for Educational Leadership and Senior Fellow at the University of Pennsylvania's Graduate School of Education.

== Personal life ==
Wilson is married to engineering professor Carol Espy-Wilson, and has twin daughters and a son.
