= Jock Wilson (British Army soldier) =

John Wilson
- Born: 7 September 1903; Edinburgh, Scotland
- Died: 29 September 2008 (aged 105); Dunbar, Scotland
- Military career
- Allegiance: United Kingdom
- Branch: British Army
- Nickname: Jock
- Units: 79th (Scottish Horse) Medium Regiment, Royal Artillery
- Conflicts: D-Day
- Awards: Military Medal; Légion d'honneur

John Nicholson "Jock" Wilson MM (7 September 1903 – 29 September 2008) was a British serviceman, who was Great Britain's oldest D-Day veteran. Wilson was a soldier in the 79th (Scottish Horse) Medium Regiment, Royal Artillery. On 6 June 1944, during the Second World War, Wilson landed at Juno Beach and participated in the fighting that led to one of the biggest defeats for Germany.

== Personal life before Second World War ==
John "Jock" Wilson was born on 7 September 1903 in Edinburgh, Scotland. He attended Leith Academy for his grammar school education. When he was fourteen, he began working at McNiven and Cameron's, who were the makers of the Waverley pens. Wilson met his wife, Lily (née Ross) during a tea party at a Marine Garden ballroom in Seafield. They married in October 1934 in Morningside and had a daughter called Joyce in 1944. When Joyce was only two weeks old, Jock Wilson flew to Normandy to fight with the 79th Regiment of the Royal Artillery against Nazi Germany.

== Second World War ==
Wilson joined the 79th Regiment of the Royal Artillery when many of his fellow soldiers were half his age. He was assigned to the radio division, which meant that his unit would land with the first group of soldiers on D-Day, 6 June 1944. Under constant attack, he and his comrades assembled a radio station to transmit information about the enemy's movements which helped the Allies determine where to deploy troops. Wilson was injured twice in the war and still had shrapnel in his arm after the war.

He was awarded the Military Medal for his actions on 14 February 1945, near the village of Viller in the Gennep municipality of the Netherlands. He was acting as technical assistant to Captain Fyffe who was attached to 1st Battalion, the Black Watch, as artillery observer, responsible for calling in artillery support and identifying targets. They had crossed the river Niers in a Buffalo overnight, and established their observation post in a flour mill in the battalion bridgehead. At around 0830, the German forces launched a counterattack, supported by self-propelled guns. Their observation post came under direct fire from two of these guns which scored 30–40 hits on the mill. Wilson was knocked down by the blast from one explosion, and hit by falling masonry but continued to assist Fyffe. Allied artillery was able to use the information provided to break up the counterattack. The award of the medal was gazetted on 24 May 1945.

== Postwar life ==
After the death of his wife in 1964, he moved from Edinburgh to Dunbar so that he could live with Joyce and her husband, Tom. In that East Lothian town, he was considered a "central figure" at Remembrance Day services. During the Remembrance Services in 2001, Wilson placed a poppy on a memorial at the Princes Street Gardens. Wilson lived with his daughter for 43 years before moving to the Hollytrees Nursing Home in Belhaven Hospital in 2007.

== Awards and honours ==
In addition to his Military Medal Wilson also received the Légion d'honneur, a prestigious military award of France, from Gérard Errera, the French ambassador, in London. When he was 90 years old, Wilson became an honorary member of the Dunbar and District Probus Club. He also received the "Our Forces Hero" award from the Daily Record and dedicated it to the soldiers who had lost their lives on D-Day in Normandy. In October 2004, Jock attended both the opening of the new Parliament in Edinburgh and Scotland's World Cup Qualifier against Norway at Hampden Park. He watched both events, which were 50 miles apart, in a limousine.

Known for his sense of humour, when Wilson and other veterans were meeting dignitaries after an awards ceremony, he said to Queen Elizabeth II, whom he had already met that day, "You know, madam, we'll have to stop meeting like this." Later, when he met the then-Prime Minister, Tony Blair, Wilson joked, "The only person to go into parliament with good intentions was Guy Fawkes, and he forgot his matches."

Wilson celebrated his 105th birthday at the Dunbar Club and received a bottle of malt. He also received a second birthday card from Queen Elizabeth II, which was presented to him by East Lothian’s Lord Lieutenant, Garth Morrison, at the Belhaven Hospital. He had received the first card from the Queen on his 104th birthday.

== Death and funeral service ==
Jock Wilson died in Dunbar, Scotland, on 29 September 2008, at the age of 105. His funeral service was held at the Mortonhall Crematorium in Edinburgh. It was conducted by Charles Robertson, the Chaplain to the Normandy Veterans' Association.
