= John Stuart Wilson =

British mathematician and composer

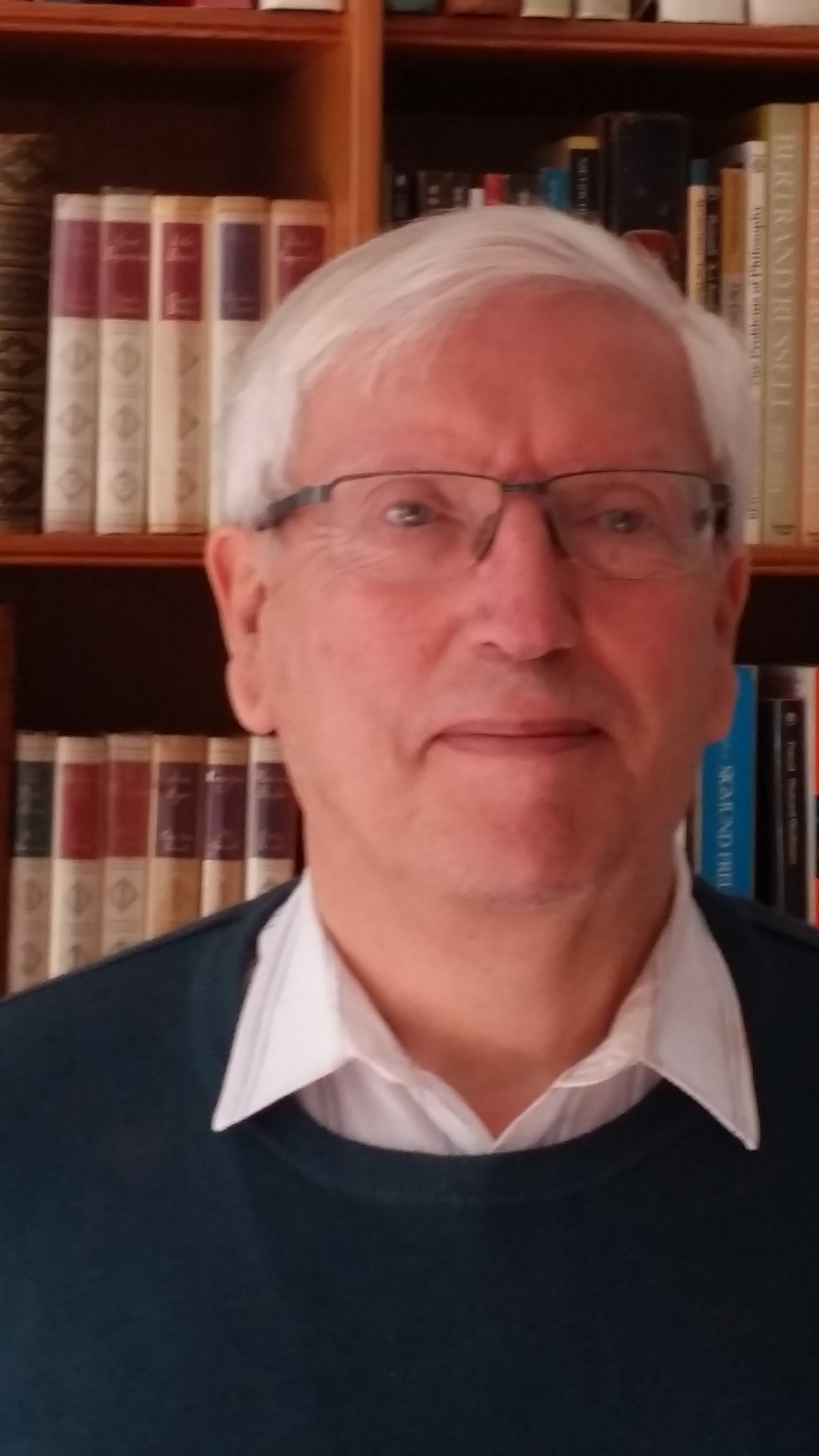
- John Stuart Wilson in 2018
- Born: 5 April 1944
- Awards: Smith's Prize (1969)

Academic background
- Education: Christ's College, Cambridge

Academic work
- Discipline: Mathematics
- Sub-discipline: Algebra
- Institutions: Christ's College, Cambridge; University of Birmingham; Mathematical Institute, University of Oxford; University of Leipzig
- Website: people.maths.ox.ac.uk/wilsonjs

John Stuart Wilson (born 5 April 1944) is a British mathematician and composer. He is a Fellow of Christ's College, Cambridge, an Honorary Professor of the University of Leipzig and a former professor of mathematics at the University of Oxford. His main area of mathematical research is algebra and group theory.

== Education ==
John Wilson received the Licentiate of the Royal Academy of Music diploma (LRAM) in 1963 shortly before beginning his mathematical education at Christ's College, Cambridge. After gaining the BA degree in 1966 he obtained the degree of PhD in 1971 with a dissertation entitled Subgroups of finite index in infinite groups. He was awarded the degree of ScD in 1989.

== Research ==
Wilson has worked on many aspects of group theory. In his doctoral thesis he studied just-infinite groups and laid the foundations for the theory of branch groups. He has made important contributions to profinite group theory, and to the model theory of groups, and has established generation results for finite simple groups and solubility criteria for finite groups.

== Mathematical career ==
John Wilson was elected a Fellow of Christ's College, Cambridge in 1969 and subsequently became a Lecturer in Mathematics in the University of Cambridge. In 1993 he was appointed to the Mason Chair of Mathematics at the University of Birmingham and in 2003 became Professor of Mathematics at the University of Oxford. On retirement from Oxford in 2011 he returned to Cambridge. He held the Leibniz Professorship at the University of Leipzig during the winter semester 2014–15 and in 2017 became an Honorary Professor of the University of Leipzig. He served as Editor-in-Chief of the Mathematical Proceedings of the Cambridge Philosophical Society from 1987 to 1992 and of the Journal of Group Theory for 20 years from its foundation in 1998. He has been an editorial board member of several other journals. He has held visiting professorships in France, Germany, Switzerland, Italy, Australia and the USA and is currently affiliated to the Max Planck Institute for Mathematics in the Sciences in Leipzig. He has published over 100 papers in international mathematics journals.

== Musical composition ==
John S. Wilson composes music for a wide variety of forces, both vocal and instrumental. He had composition lessons with Luciano Berio. Much of his education in writing for choirs was gained while singing with choirs in three continents, sometimes under the batons of distinguished conductors including Benjamin Britten and Nicholas Cleobury. His choral compositions include anthems, psalm and canticle settings, part songs and a cantata. They range in difficulty from works for highly trained singers to pieces for parish church choirs.

His chamber music includes works for small wind or string ensembles, for solo instrument plus piano, and for more unusual combinations such as harmonica and organ. He has written pieces for organ or piano alone as well as Lieder on texts by writers ranging from Goethe to Tennessee Wiliams and Martin Luther King. His music has been performed widely in the UK and in Germany and France, in venues such as Jesus College Chapel, Cambridge, the Nikolaikirche in Leipzig and St. Étienne-du-Mont in Paris. Wilson has frequently contributed to discussions on the relationship between creativity in mathematics and the arts.
