= John West Wilson =

Businessman and arts patron

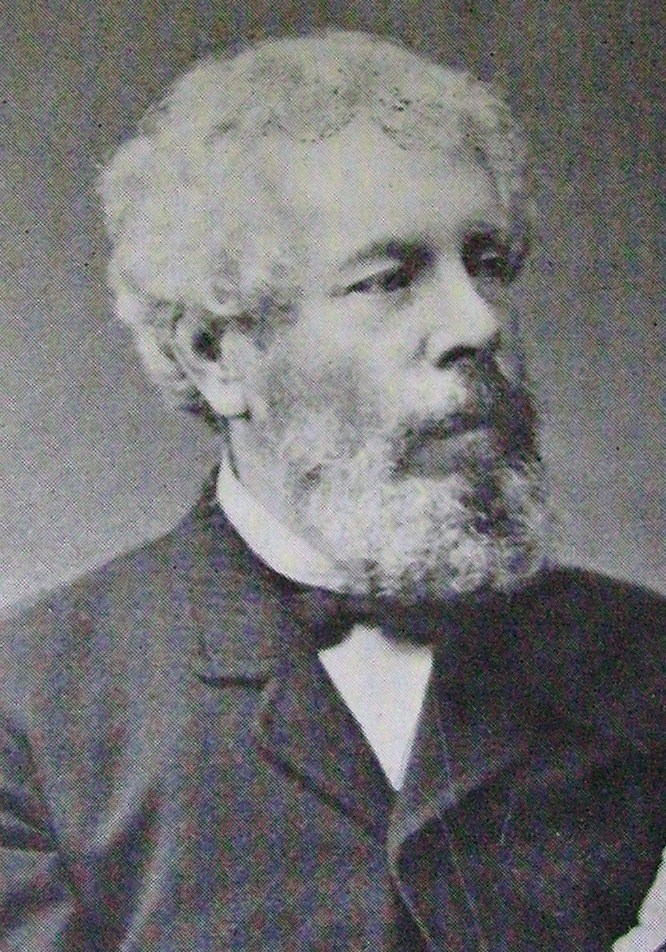
Wilson by an unknown photographer.

John West Wilson (8 October 1816 – 24 May 1889) was a businessman and arts patron.

== Biography ==
John West Wilson was born at Hull, United Kingdom. He was the son of Thomas Wilson (1792–1869), founder of the shipping company Thomas Wilson Sons & Co. which introduced scheduled services between Hull, England and Gothenburg, Sweden in 1825 and ran steamers on the route between 1840 and 1842.

John Wilson founded the firm JW Wilson at Gothenburg in 1844, operating it in conjunction with the existing family business to trade in corn, wood, paper, pulp and coal, while he also exported cattle there during the Crimean War.

In 1850 John Wilson opened a regular steamship service between Gothenburg and Hull, which proved particularly effective in transporting emigrants from northern Europe to America. In 1865 the company AB Göteborg-London was formed. In 1882 this became part of the Thule Company after Wilson became a partner in the latter.

Wilson served on Gothenburg's city council from 1867 to 1886 as well as director of the Skandinaviska Kredit and vice chairman of the trade associations council. He was also treasurer of the Gothenburg Museum's board of directors and made many donations. Wilson died at Gothenburg, Sweden.

== Related reading ==
- Credland, Arthur G.; Thompson, Michael (1994) The Wilson Line of Hull 1831–1981: The Rise and Fall of an Empire Cherry Burton, UK: Hutton Press Ltd, ISBN 978-1-872167-58-9
- Harrower, John (1998) The Wilson Line : the history and fleet of Thos. Wilson, Sons & Co. and Ellerman's Wilson Line Ltd. (Gravesend: The World Ship Society) ISBN 978-0-905617-72-5
