= John Wilson (1920s pitcher) =

American baseball player (1903–1980)

- Pitcher
- Born: April 25, 1903; Coal City, Alabama
- Died: April 25, 1980 (aged 77); Chattanooga, Tennessee
- Batted: Right Threw: Right

MLB debut
- May 9, 1927, for the Boston Red Sox

Last MLB appearance
- April 24, 1928, for the Boston Red Sox

MLB statistics
- Win–loss record: 0-2
- Strikeouts: 9
- Earned run average: 4.45
- Stats at Baseball Reference

Teams
- Boston Red Sox (1927–28)

John Samuel Wilson (April 25, 1903 – August 27, 1980) was a professional baseball pitcher. He played parts of two seasons in Major League Baseball, 1927 and 1928, for the Boston Red Sox. Listed at 6 ft 2 in (1.88 m), 164 lb., Wilson batted and threw right-handed. He was born in Coal City, Alabama.

In his major league career, Wilson posted a 0–2 record with nine strikeouts and a 4.45 ERA in seven appearances, including two starts, two complete games, and 30.1 innings pitched. He continued to play minor league baseball as late as 1945.

Wilson died at the age of 77 in Chattanooga, Tennessee.
