= John W. Wilson =

Belgian art collector (1815–1883)

John Waterloo Wilson
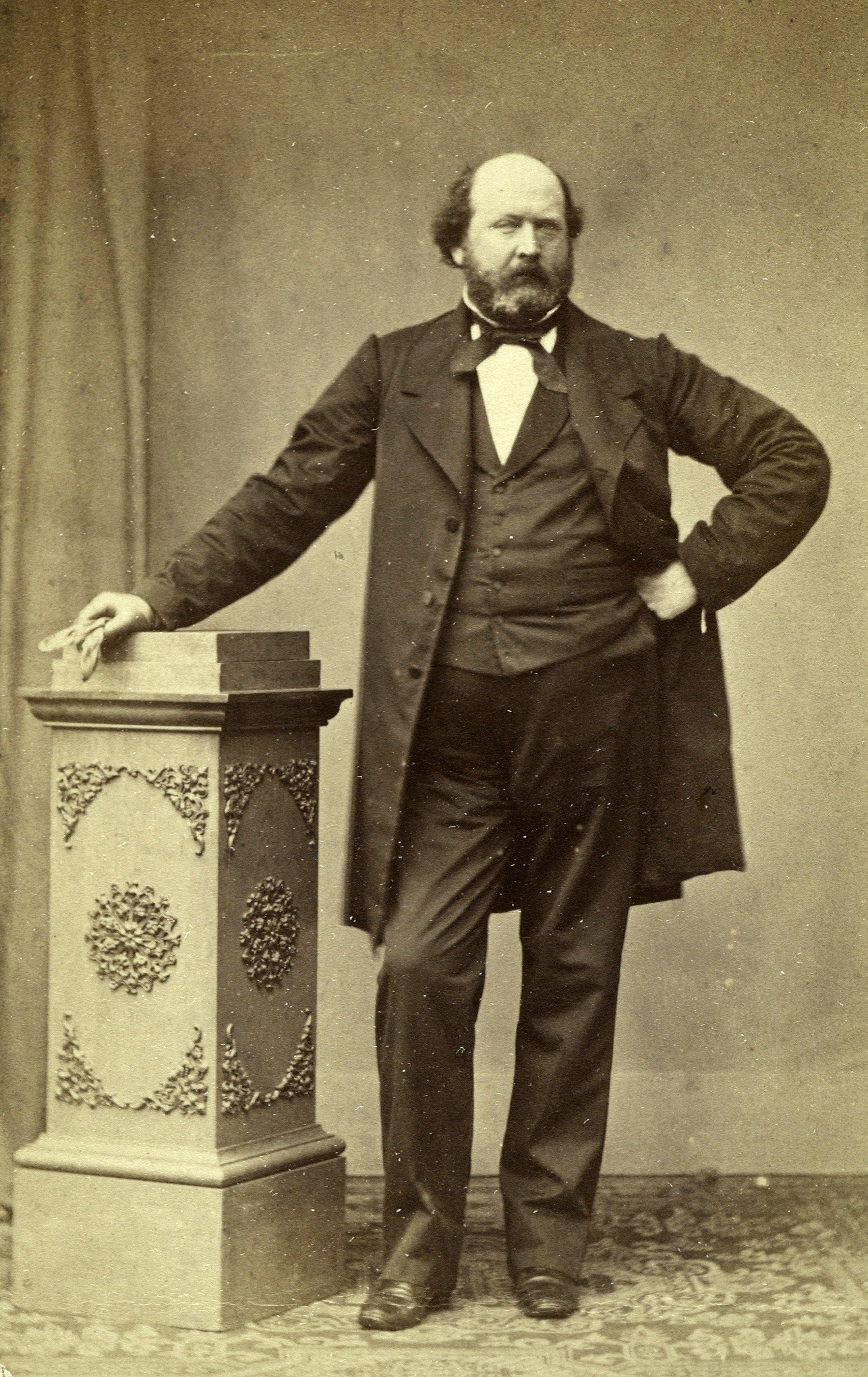
- Born: May 16, 1815; Brussels
- Died: August 12, 1883 (aged 68); Neuilly-sur-Seine

John Waterloo Wilson (May 16, 1815 – August 12, 1883) was a Belgian art collector who lived many years in Haarlem.

Wilson was born in Brussels as the son of the British industrialist Thomas Wilson, whose factory in Ukkel-Stalle had been damaged in 1830 by workers on strike. As a friend of Willem I of the Netherlands Thomas won a contract for a new cotton factory in Haarlem and the young John relocated there with his family in 1833. He studied chemistry in Manchester, England, presumably to learn more about the cotton-dyeing process that Haarlem was famous for at the time. In 1839 he married the daughter of the Haarlem mayor Wilhelmina Christina van Valkenburg, who died young in 1844 and left him with three young children. He travelled in Turkey and Egypt but his health prevented him from travel in 1872 when he started to concentrate on art collecting. He followed in his father's footsteps as director of the firm and also as art collector, but returned to Brussels in 1873 where he showed his art collection and published a catalogue. His collector's mark is known as Lugt number 2581.

Like his father before him, Wilson was also owner of a manor house in Overijssel. He left 27 paintings and a large sum of money to the city of Brussels, which named a street after him in gratitude: Rue John Waterloo Wilson. His gift was instrumental in founding the Museum of the City of Brussels. He and his father's cotton factory is remembered on its former location in Haarlem as the "Wilsonplein", today the location of the city theatre.

Wilson died in Neuilly-sur-Seine. He was the grandfather of the Dutch sport shooter John Wilson.
