= John Wilson (businessman) =

John Alexander Wilson (21 April 1829 – 28 April 1909) was a notable New Zealand farmer, soldier, public servant, judge and businessman. He was born in Condé-sur-Noireau, France in 1829. He was the son of Anne Wilson and the Rev. John Alexander Wilson, who joined the Church Missionary Society (CMS) and was stationed at Tauranga.

Wilson was a member of the Auckland Provincial Council, representing the Pensioner Settlements electorate from 7 October 1857 to 12 September 1861. He was a judge at the Native Land Court for many years. He owned Whakaari/White Island off the coast from Tauranga and had it mined for sulphur.
