= John Alexander Wilson (missionary) =

English missionary (1809–1887)

- Born: 15 June 1809; Ipswich, England
- Died: 5 June 1887 (aged 77); Jersey, Channel Islands
- Occupations: Anglican Minister and Missionary
- Spouse(s): Anne Catherine Hawker (married 1828, died 1838); Charlotte Jane Emma Dent (married 1863)

John Alexander Wilson (15 June 1809 – 5 June 1887) was an Anglican missionary and a member of the Church Missionary Society (CMS) mission in New Zealand in the 19th century. He entered the Royal Navy in 1822 as a gentleman volunteer. He participated in the capture of a pirate vessel in the Bay of Campeche off Mexico, and the rescue in 1824 by HMS Windsor Castle of John VI of Portugal out of the hands of a faction in the April Revolt. He married Anne Catherine Hawker in Jersey in 1828. Wilson retired from the Royal Navy and in 1832 he joined the CMS as a lay missionary.

== Work with the Church Missionary Society ==
Wilson, his wife and their family sailed from London on 21 September 1832 on the convict ship Camden to Port Jackson, New South Wales, Australia, then they sailed on the Byron to the Bay of Islands, New Zealand, arriving on 11 April 1833.

In 1833, he and William Thomas Fairburn, John Morgan and James Preece opened a mission station at Puriri on the Waihou River. and in 1834 Wilson and Rev. A. N. Brown established a mission station at Matamata. In 1835, Te Waharoa, the leader of the Ngāti Hauā iwi (Māori tribe) of the Matamata region, lead his warriors against neighbouring tribes to avenge the death of a relative, with the fighting, which continued into 1836, extended from Rotorua to Tauranga. On 5 January 1836 Wilson and William Wade went to Te Papa Mission, Tauranga. The same year Wilson and Thomas Chapman established a mission station in Rotorua. After a house at the Rotorua mission was ransacked, both the Rotorua mission and the Matamata mission were not considered safe and the wives of the missionaries were escorted to Puriri and Tauranga. Wilson and the other CMS missionaries attempted to bring peace to the belligerents. In late March 1836, a war party led by Te Waharoa arrived at Tauranga and the missionary families boarded the Columbine as a safety precaution on 31 March. They spend 1837 in the Bay of Islands, then returned to Tauranga in January 1838. In 1937 the missionaries at Te Papa Mission were the Rev. A. N. Brown, James Stack and Wilson.

Anne Wilson died on 23 November 1838, leaving her four young sons, including John Wilson, to be brought up by their father. Anne Wilson was the first European person buried in the mission cemetery at Otamataha Pā. In 1840 Wilson established a mission station at Ōpōtiki.

In 1852 Wilson was appointed by the Central Committee of the CMS to the charge of the Auckland missionary district which extended from Whangārei to Taupō. He attended St John's College, Auckland. Wilson was ordained a deacon in 1852.

In 1860–61, Wilson was a missionary-chaplain to Māori war-parties at the Otawhao Mission of John Morgan and at Waitara, Taranaki. He acted as chaplain with permission of the commanders of the colonial government forces but he did not have the permission of Bishop Selwyn. He was present at the Battle of Puketakauere on 23 June 1860; the action at Huirangi in December 1860 against the major Māori defensive line called Te Arei that barred the way to the historic hill pā of Pukerangiora; and the battle on 23 January 1861, when the Māori warriors attacked a redoubt, which was garrisoned by the 40th Regiment.

In February 1862 Wilson travelled to Europe. He married Charlotte Jane Emma Dent in Copenhagen, by special license of the King of Denmark, as the Anglican Church had refused to marry them because of their familial relationship. Charlotte was his first wife's niece and also his daughter-in-law's sister (his son John Wilson had married Charlotte's sister Anne Lydia Dent in 1855). The couple had two sons and three daughters.

== Retirement ==
Wilson left New Zealand in 1866, and his connection with the CSM ended on 21 January 1868.

He died on 5 June 1887 on Jersey, Channel Islands.
