= John A. Wilson (topographical engineer) =

American surveyor and civil engineer

John A Wilson
- Born: March 9, 1789; Stirling, Scotland
- Died: February 27, 1833 (aged 43); Cuba
- Occupations: surveyor, civil engineer, topography engineer
- Children: W. Hasell Wilson

John A Wilson (March 9, 1789 – February 27, 1833) was a prominent American surveyor and civil engineer in the 19th century. His son, W. Hasell Wilson (1811–1902), was a civil engineer for the Pennsylvania Railroad.

== Early life and works ==
Wilson was born on March 9, 1789, in Stirling, Scotland to Eliza Gibbes and James Wilson (d. 1798), a Lieutenant in the 71st (Highland) Regiment of Foot of the British Army. Throughout the American Revolutionary War, the elder Wilson (James) served as an engineer in the British forces, under Major Moncrief of the Royal Engineers. James Wilson was severely wounded at the siege of Charleston, South Carolina, in 1780. Wilson remained in Charleston until the close of the war, and married there a daughter of Dr. Robert Wilson, a local physician of prominence. The elder Wilson returned to Stirling where his son, John was born in 1789. John Wilson attended the University of Edinburgh and at the end of his studies traveled to the United States to rejoin his family in South Carolina circa 1807. He found work as an engineer and surveyor, preparing a map of South Carolina.

=== War of 1812 ===
In the early part of the War of 1812, John Wilson, who had become a naturalized citizen of the United States, volunteered his services to the city of Charleston, as an engineer for the construction of works of defense.

Wilson died on February 27, 1833, on board ship in the harbor of Matanzas, Cuba.
