= William Collins (publisher) =

Scottish editor and publisher

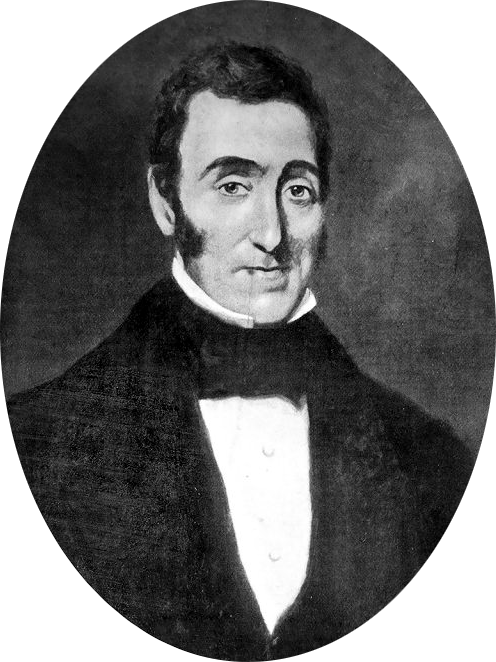
- William Collins
- Church: Free Church of Scotland

Personal details
- Born: 12 October 1789 Eastwood, Renfrewshire, Scotland
- Died: 2 January 1853 (aged 63) Rothesay, Buteshire, Scotland
- Denomination: Christianity

William Collins (12 October 1789 – 2 January 1853) was a Scottish schoolmaster, editor and publisher who founded William Collins, Sons, now part of HarperCollins. William Collins was born at Eastwood, Renfrewshire, on 12 October 1789. He was a millworker who established a company in 1819 for printing and publishing. The business eventually published pamphlets, sermons, hymn books and prayer books as well as a wide range of office products. By 1824 he had produced the company's first dictionary, the Greek and English Lexicon. He was instrumental in bringing Thomas Chalmers from Kilmany to Glasgow. He also obtained a licence to publish the Bible in the 1840s. He was promoter of Scotland's first temperance movement. He founded the Glasgow Church Building Society which created 20 new churches. He died on 2 January 1853 at Rothesay, Buteshire.

== Church elder ==
At the age of twenty-five Collins was ordained an elder in the congregation of the Tron Church, Glasgow, then under the pastoral care of Dr M'Gill. In the course of his reading he happened to peruse the article on the Evidences of Christianity in the Encydopcedia Britannica. The freshness of its intellectual power, and the glow of its moral and evangelical enthusiasm, impressed and delighted him. Accordingly, when Dr M'Gill died, Collins turned his eyes to the author of the article which had so fascinated him, the Rev. Thomas Chalmers, as a suitable successor to Dr M'Gill, and greatly aided in the movement which resulted in the appointment by the Town Council of the young minister of Kilmany to the church and parish of the Tron. From no one did Dr Chalmers receive a heartier welcome on his induction in 1815 than from the youngest member of his session, Collins.

== Work with Thomas Chalmers ==
When Dr Chalmers originated the idea of local Sabbath Schools, Collins opened the first school. Chalmers was next transferred to the new parish of St John's. Collins accompanied his minister to his new charge, and still kept his place by his side. To Dr Chalmers, with his keen political and social insight, it belonged to originate methods of civic and Christian economy, and to expound and recommend them. But his elder, quiet and unobtrusive, came after him, testing the ideas of his chief, and giving them practical realization in the hovels of the poor.

== Collins and the slave trade ==
Collins advocated for the abolition of African slavery, at a time when that cause was not so popular as it came to be at a later date. This brought him into contact and co-operation with William Wilberforce, Zachary Macaulay, and other champions of the emancipation of the slave. The fact that he took openly the side of the slaves, and that petitions for emancipation lay in his book shop, alienated some of his business customers, many of whom were largely interested in the West India trade.

== Publishing of religious works ==
Collins published religious literature by reprinting, in a more accessible form, many of the writings of the divines of the sixteenth and seventeenth century. To these volumes suitable introductions were prefixed, written by the more eminent clergymen and laymen of the day, of all denominations.

== Involvement in the temperance movement ==
When the temperance cause found its way to Scotland from the United States in 1829, Collins hailed it, as "throwing a ray of light," to use his own words, upon a dark problem. He was the earliest member of the Glasgow and West of Scotland Temperance Society, and he laboured to promote its object. He visited, on this errand, many of the towns of Scotland, and even extended his tours to Manchester, Liverpool, and London, in all which places he delivered addresses to large audiences. He visited the metropolis three times, and succeeded, on his third visit, in forming the British and Foreign Temperance Society. At one of its early meetings in Exeter Hall he delivered his famous lecture on the "Harmony of the Gospel and Temperance Societies". From 1829 to 1834 a large portion of his time and means were devoted to the maintenance of a cause which he regarded as very important.

== Glaswegian church building scheme ==
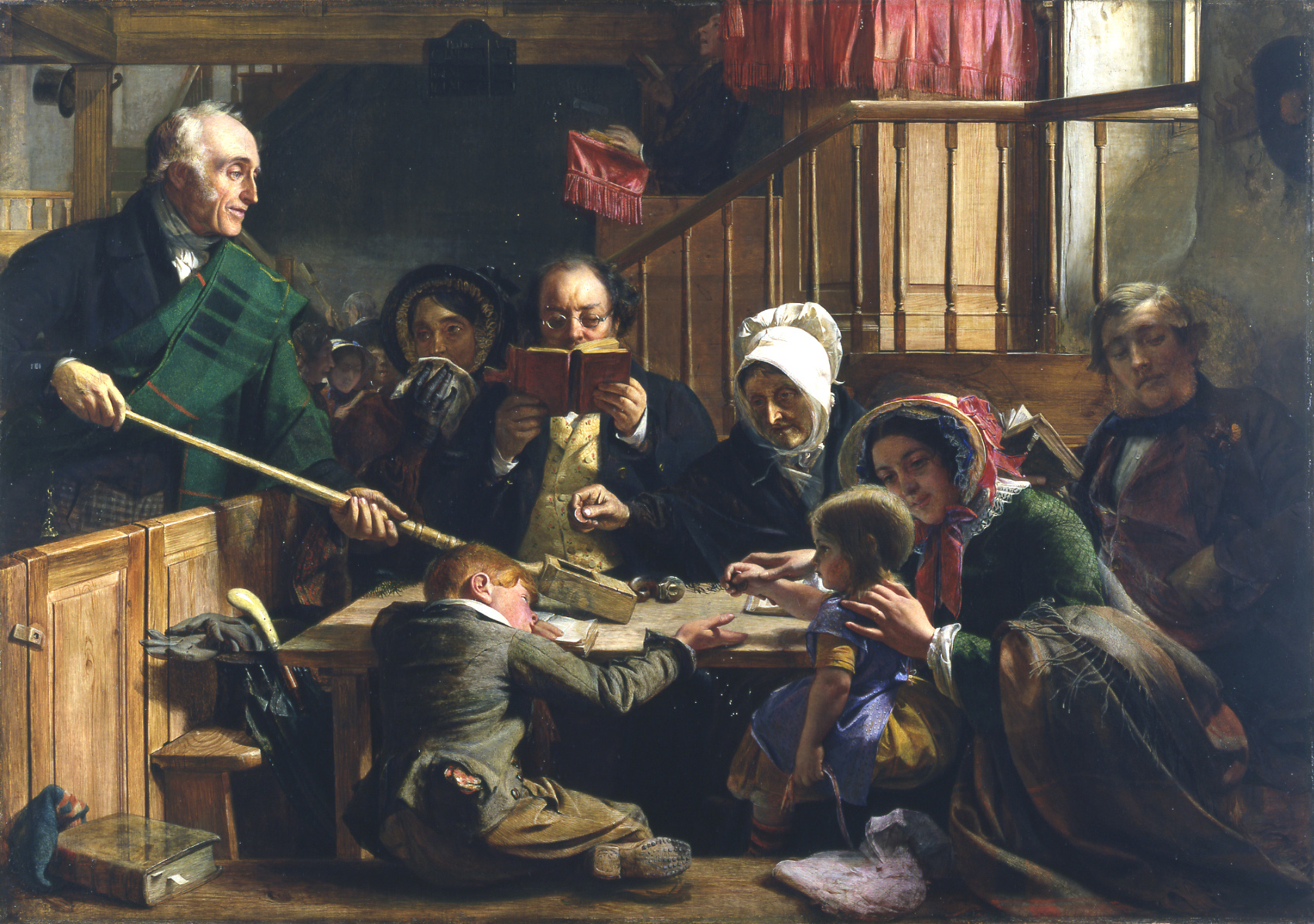
Collecting the Offering in a Scottish Kirk by John Phillip

After talking with his daughter Collins conceived of his grand enterprise of aiming to provide twenty additional parish churches for Glasgow. Many pronounced his scheme a "devout imagination;" but the very greatness of the enterprise contributed largely to its success. Christian philanthropy in those days found vent in contributions of one guinea, five guineas, and, on very extraordinary occasions, ten guineas. Here was an appeal to Christian men to unite in achieving a great object of an evangelical kind by contributions of £200 each, payable in five instalments. This was a novelty; but a novelty that first astounded and next attracted men. The originator, they saw, was in earnest. He had given proof of this by subscribing at once his own quota, from, as was known, very slender means. His example stimulated the liberality of those whose incomes were five, ten, twenty fold that of the propounder of the scheme, and the result was that in a few months Collins had obtained, mainly by his own exertions, the sum of; £22,000; and only eight years after he had first mooted his proposal before an incredulous public, he had the happiness of consummating his enterprise by laying the foundation stone of the twentieth church erected under the auspices of the Glasgow Church Building Society. Of these churches, not fewer than thirteen or fourteen had the name of William Collins graven on their foundation stone.

== National church building scheme ==
The work was taken up by Dr Chalmers, who resolved on doing for Scotland what Collins had done for Glasgow. A Government Commission was appointed to inquire into the matter. Elaborate statistics of the spiritual destitution of Glasgow were given in by Collins to that commission. These were not without important results. Copies were sent to all the dignitaries of the Church of England, and the result of their circulation among the English bishops and clergy, was the formation of church building societies in at least two of the dioceses of the sister kingdom. The metropolis of England did not deem it beneath it to follow in the wake of Presbyterian Glasgow, nor its metropolitan pastor to copy the example of the elder of the Tron.

== Post Disruption church building ==
In the labours of the busy years following the Disruption to provide churches, manses, and schools for the congregations of the Free Church, he took part, according to the measure of his strength. He laid the foundation stone of the new Church erected for the congregation of Free St John's, then under the pastoral care of Dr Thomas Brown. He also laid the foundation stone of the Free Tron, of which Dr Robert Buchanan was minister; and now he connected himself once more with the session of that congregation. He had left it twenty-one years before; he now returned and acted as an elder in it till he died.

== Last days ==
In 1848, with failing health he relocated to Rothesay. There he took an active part in the establishing of a missionary station in the most destitute part of that town. On Sabbath, 2 January 1853, Collins died.

== Family ==
His son Sir William Collins served as Lord Provost of Glasgow.

== Artistic portrayal ==
He was portrayed by William Wallace.
