= Andrew Robert Fausset =

Irish Anglican clergyman and author

Andrew Robert Fausset (1821–1910) was an Irish Anglican clergyman, now known as a biblical commentator. He was an evangelical preacher and author.

== Life ==
Born on 13 October 1821 at Silverhill, County Fermanagh, he was the son of the Rev. William Fausset by his wife Elizabeth, daughter of Andrew Fausset, provost of Sligo; the family was of French origin. Educated first at Dungannon Royal School, he obtained a scholarship at Trinity College, Dublin in 1838. Gaining prizes and awards there, he graduated B.A. in 1843 (senior moderator in classics), and won the vice-chancellor's Latin verse prize both that year and in 1844. He obtained the divinity testimonium (second class) in 1845, and graduated M.A. in 1846, proceeding B.D. and D.D. in 1886.

On graduating, Fausset became an academic coach at Trinity. He was ordained deacon in 1847 and priest in 1848 by Edward Maltby, the Bishop of Durham, and served from 1847 to 1859 as curate of Bishop Middleham, a Durham colliery village. From 1859 until his death he was rector of the parish of St Cuthbert's Church, York.

In 1885 Fausset was made a prebendary of York Minster. He died at York on 8 February 1910.

== Works ==
Fausset wrote much on biblical prophecy. He was a co-author of the Jamieson-Fausset-Brown Bible Commentary, with Robert Jamieson (minister) and David Brown. This work appeared in six volumes, from 1864 to 1870, and then had numerous full or abridged editions. Fausset's share in this Critical, Experimental and Practical Commentary was volumes iii., iv., (Job to Malachi) and vi (I Corinthians to Revelation). His other religious publications were:

- Scripture and the Prayer-Book in Harmony, 1854; revised ed. 1894, an answer to objections against the liturgy.
- Volumes ii. and iv. (Job, Ecclesiastes, Malachi; Corinthians I and Revelation) in the Critical and Explanatory Pocket Bible, 1863–4.
- Studies in the CL. Psalms, 1877; 2nd edit. 1885, an application of the argument from "undesigned coincidences".
- The Englishman's Critical and Expository Bible Cyclopædia, originally issued in parts, in volume form, 1878. It appeared in 1891 as 950,000 words.
- Signs of the Times, 1881.
- Commentary on Judges, 1885.
- Guide to the Study of the Book of Common Prayer, 1894, 3rd edit. 1903.

Fausset also translated into English Johann Albrecht Bengel's Gnomon of the New Testament (1857), with notes and a life of Bengel. As a classical scholar, he produced editions of:

- The comedies of Terence (omitting the Eunuch) (1844);
- Homer's Iliad, i.–viii. (1846), influenced by criticisms of Friedrich August Wolf, Carsten Niebuhr and George Grote; and of
- Livy, i.-iii., with prolegomena and notes (1849).

He translated also the Hecuba (1850) and the Medea (1851) of Euripides.

== Family ==
Fausset was three times married:

1. in 1859, to Elizabeth, daughter of William Knowlson, of York, by whom he had three sons and one daughter;
2. in 1874, to Agnes Antonia, daughter of Major William Porter, of Hembury Fort, Honiton, by whom he had one son; and
3. in 1889, to Frances, youngest daughter of the Rev. Dr. William Alder Strange, headmaster of Abingdon School and vicar of Bishop Middleham.
