= List of listed buildings in Currie, Edinburgh =

This is a list of listed buildings in the parish of Currie in Edinburgh, Scotland.

== List ==
Name	Location	Date Listed	Grid Ref. (Note: Sometimes known as OSGB36, the grid reference (where provided) is based on the British national grid reference system used by the Ordnance Survey. • "Guide to National Grid". Ordnance Survey. • "Get-a-map". Ordnance Survey.)	Geo-coordinates	Notes	LB Number (Note: Historic Environment Scotland assign a unique alphanumeric identifier to each designated site in Scotland, for listed buildings this always begins with "LB", for example "LB12345".)	Image
Currie Parish Church Manse Including Office Court At Rear And Garden Walls, Off Kirkgate, Currie				55°53′43″N 3°18′26″W	Category B	6113	Upload Photo
Currie Post Office, Lanark Road West And Riccarton Mains Road				55°53′48″N 3°18′31″W	Category C(S)	6118	Upload Photo
Curriebank, 105 Lanark Road West				55°53′51″N 3°18′10″W	Category C(S)	6124	Upload Photo
Fisherbank And Bathiebrae, 111, 113 Lanark Road West				55°53′50″N 3°18′13″W	Category B	6125	Upload Photo
375 -377 Lanark Road West				55°53′33″N 3°19′16″W	Category C(S)	6128	Upload Photo
Currie Parish Church, Churchyard (Original Area Only) Kirkgate, Currie				55°53′41″N 3°18′28″W	Category B	6140	Upload another image
Smiddy And Sseb Substation, 204 Lanark Road West				55°53′47″N 3°18′37″W	Category C(S)	6121	Upload Photo
99, 101, Lanark Road West				55°53′52″N 3°18′08″W	Category C(S)	6123	Upload Photo
200, 202 And 204 Lanark Road West				55°53′47″N 3°18′37″W	Category C(S)	6120	Upload Photo
209 Lanark Road West				55°53′45″N 3°18′38″W	Category C(S)	6127	Upload Photo
Rosebery Cottages (Old School, Now Ellenvale And Sycamore Cottage) Including Garden Walls Kirkgate, Currie				55°53′43″N 3°18′31″W	Category B	6115	Upload another image
Currie Farmhouse, Now 1, 2 Easter Currie Court, Lanark Road West				55°53′48″N 3°18′29″W	Category B	6117	Upload Photo
Millbank, 33 Lanark Road West				55°54′00″N 3°17′41″W	Category C(S)	6122	Upload Photo
Union Canal Bridge 9 East Hermiston				55°55′17″N 3°18′30″W	Category C(S)	6096	Upload Photo
Schoolhouse, Kirkgate, Currie Including Garden Walls				55°53′43″N 3°18′29″W	Category C(S)	6114	Upload Photo
161-165 (No. 165 Eden Cottage) Lanark Road West				55°53′48″N 3°18′24″W	Category B	6126	Upload Photo
Currie Village Currie Parish Church (St Kentigern's)				55°53′42″N 3°18′29″W	Category A	6139	Upload Photo
21-24 (Inclusive Numbers) Braeburn Drive				55°53′35″N 3°17′58″W	Category B	6093	Upload Photo
194 Lanark Road West				55°53′48″N 3°18′32″W	Category C(S)	6119	Upload Photo
Kinleith Bridge Water Of Leith				55°53′59″N 3°17′41″W	Category B	5706	Upload another image
Gibson Craig Memorial Hall, Lanark Road West				55°53′49″N 3°18′22″W	Category C(S)	6116	Upload Photo

== Key ==
The scheme for classifying buildings in Scotland is:

- Category A: "buildings of national or international importance, either architectural or historic; or fine, little-altered examples of some particular period, style or building type."
- Category B: "buildings of regional or more than local importance; or major examples of some particular period, style or building type, which may have been altered."
- Category C: "buildings of local importance; lesser examples of any period, style, or building type, as originally constructed or moderately altered; and simple traditional buildings which group well with other listed buildings."

In March 2016 there were 47,288 listed buildings in Scotland. Of these, 8% were Category A, and 50% were Category B, with the remaining 42% being Category C.

== See also ==
- List of listed buildings in Edinburgh
