= Robert Jamieson (moderator) =

Church of Scotland minister and moderator 1872

Robert Jamieson (1802–1880) was a minister of the Church of Scotland and religious author, who served as Moderator of the General Assembly in 1872.

== Life ==
He was born on 3 January 1802 the son of Robert Jamieson, a baker in Edinburgh. He was educated nearby at Edinburgh High School then studied at Edinburgh University. He was licensed to preach by the Presbytery of Biggar in February 1827.

He was ordained as minister of Westruther in the Scottish Borders in April 1830. In December 1837 he translated to Currie just south of Edinburgh in place of John Somerville. In March 1844 he translated to St John's Church in Glasgow in place of John Forbes who left in the Disruption of 1843. In April 1848 he was awarded an honorary Doctor of Divinity from Glasgow University.

In 1872 he succeeded Robert Horne Stevenson as Moderator of the General Assembly of the Church of Scotland the highest position in the Scottish Church. He was succeeded in turn by Robert Gillan.

He died at 156 Randolph Terrace on 26 October 1880. He is buried in Sighthill Cemetery in Glasgow.

== Family ==
In June 1830 he married his cousin Eliza Jamieson (d. 1890), daughter of George Jamieson also a baker. Their children included:

- Jane Hunter Jamieson (1831–1902) author of "History of a Pound Note"
- Robert Walter Mackenzie Jamieson (1833–1845)
- Mary Ann Ewart Jamieson (1835–1915)
- Rev Dr George Thomas Jamieson (b. 1838) minister of Portobello, Edinburgh
- Agnes Helen Jamieson (1840–1899)
- William Andrew Jamieson (b. 1842) a merchant in Glasgow
- David Hunter Jamieson and his twin John (died young)
- Eliza died in infancy
- Robert Jamieson (1851–1891) died in Canada

== Publications ==
- Eastern Manners 3 vols. (1836–1838)
- Manners and Trials of the Primitive Christians (1839)
- The Inspiration of the Holy Scriptures (1873)
- Multiple contributions to John Kitto's "Bible Cyclopaedia"
- Editor of "The Excitement" (1840–1841)
- Contributor to Paxton's "Illustrations of Scriptures"
- Commentary on the Old and New Testaments (with A R Faussett and Rev Dr David Brown) 6 vols 1864–1874
- Account of Currie Parish (1845)
- Account of Westruther Parish (1845)
