= Jamieson-Fausset-Brown Bible Commentary =

Biblical commentary

Commentary Critical and Explanatory on the Whole Bible
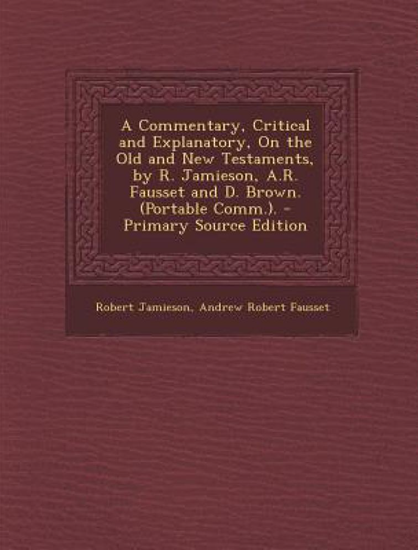
- Editor: Robert Jamieson, Andrew Robert Fausset and David Brown
- Genre: Biblical commentary
- Publication date: 1871

The Jamieson-Fausset-Brown Bible Commentary refers to a biblical commentary entitled a Commentary Critical and Explanatory on the Whole Bible, prepared by Robert Jamieson, Andrew Robert Fausset and David Brown and published in 1871; and derived works from this initial publication, in differing numbers of volumes and abridgements.

== Background ==
Robert Jamieson (1802–1880) was a minister at St Paul's Church, Provanmill in Glasgow. Andrew Fausset (1821–1910) was rector of St Cuthbert’s Church in York. David Brown (1803–1897) was a Free Church of Scotland minister at St James, Glasgow, and professor of theology at Free Church College of the University of Aberdeen.

The writers described their work as:

[a] humble effort to make Scripture expound itself.

and prayed:

May the Blessed Lord who has caused all holy Scriptures to be written for our learning, bless this ... effort ... and make it an instrument towards the conversion of sinners and the edification of saints, to the glory of His great name and the hastening of His kingdom! Amen.

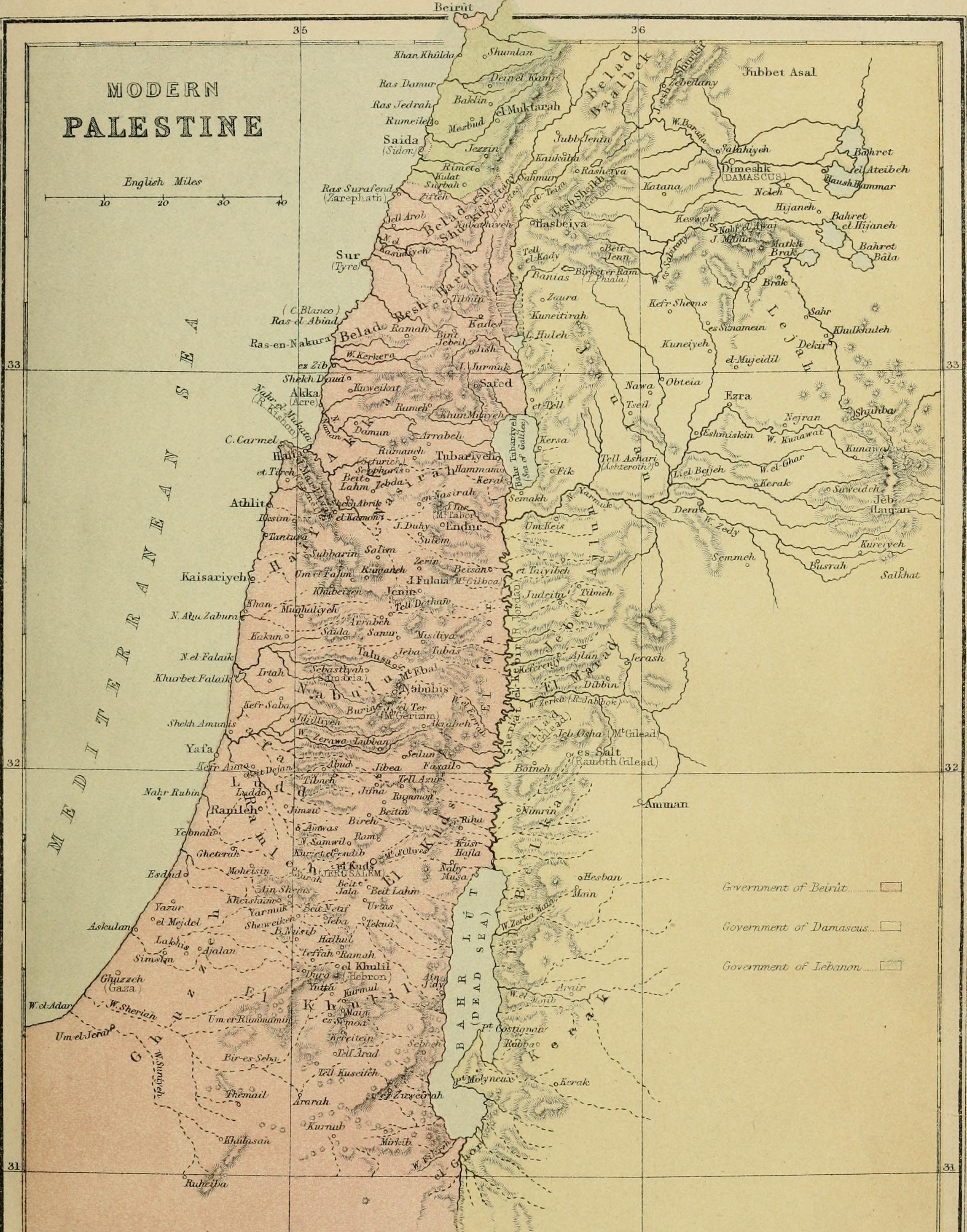
Map of Palestine from the Commentary, Critical, Experimental, and Practical

== Example text ==
On Genesis 1:1 -

1. In the beginning — a period of remote and unknown antiquity, hid in the depths of eternal ages; and so the phrase is used in Proverbs 8:22–23:

God — the name of the Supreme Being, signifying in Hebrew, "Strong," "Mighty." It is expressive of omnipotent power; and by its use here in the plural form, is obscurely taught at the opening of the Bible, a doctrine clearly revealed in other parts of it, namely, that though God is one, there is a plurality of persons in the Godhead — Father, Son, and Spirit, who were engaged in the creative work (Proverbs 8:27; John 1:3, 10; Ephesians 3:9; Hebrews 1:2; Job 26:13).
