= James Thomson (weaver poet) =

- Born: 10 September 1763; Edinburgh, Scotland
- Died: 1832 (aged 68–69); Currie, Scotland
- Occupation: Poet

James Thomson (10 September 1763 – 1832) was a Scottish weaver poet of Currie, near Edinburgh, whose poetry in the Scottish vernacular was published in Leith in the early 19th century. He is remembered by the Poet's Glen in Currie, a wooded dell with a scenic riverside path which is a right of way, and by a number of street names (Thomson Road, Thomson Drive, Thomson Crescent) in the east of Currie.

== Early life ==
When James Thomson was born on 10 September 1763 in Edinburgh, his parents were too poor to bring him up and when he was four months old they sent him to be brought up by his mother's parents in the small village of Kenleith in the parish of Currie, where his grandfather was a weaver. The name Kenleith comes from Killeith, the chapel of the Water of Leith. The farm where Thomson lived lies higher up the Kinleith Burn to the south of Currie Kirk, and is now known as Mid Kinleith.

When six years old, Thomson was sent to the parish school but after he caught smallpox his grandmother kept him at home and he was taught to read by his grandmother and an aunt. He was given the duty of herding, and each day took his grandfather's cow to the field with ballads or a book of songs in his pocket. He particularly liked the songs of Allan Ramsay, and learnt The Gentle Shepherd by heart.

He was apprenticed as a weaver when 13 years old, learning from his grandfather so well that business which had suffered from his grandfather's failing eyesight soon picked up. Thomson also returned to school to learn to write, but his handwriting remained untidy. He was able to buy a fiddle and became a musician, entertaining his friends with music and with his poems. He married a young woman from the same village. His grandfather fell ill and died, and for a while Thomson and his wife lived in the parish of Colinton before returning to Kenleith. His weaving supported his family and his grandmother.

Thomson and his wife had seven daughters and one son. They lived on Mid Kinleith farm in a small cottage which they named after Mount Parnassus. During the day he worked as a weaver, and in the evenings composed songs and poems, depicting local characters and places. He became known for useful skills, including trimming the beards of locals, and for his poetry. A new minister in the parish needed his razors sharpened, and when he sent them to Thomson they were returned well sharpened along with suitable verses for the occasion.

== Works ==
With the minister's encouragement, a book of Poems, in the Scottish dialect by James Thomson, Weaver in Kinleith, was published in 1801, printed by J. Fillans & Sons, Edinburgh, and published by W. Reid, Leith, for the Author. This opened with An Account of the Author, giving his life story, and a Dedication to the Merchants of Leith. The contents include a sharp epigram:

Ye Doctors, use your greatest care,

Your patients' lives a while to spare;

On this alone depends your wealth,

To keep alive, though not in health.

A set of four love songs describes the author being too bold in the first, then in the second bidding farewell to buchts, or sheep-folds, he had become excessively shy. The tune "Logan Water" as well as the first verse of the poem itself refer to the Logan Burn. In the chorus he laments no longer taking pleasure in the singing of the laverock, the skylark.

Fareweel, ye bughts, an' all your ewes,

An' fields whare bIoomin' heather grows;

Nae mair the sportin' lambs I'll see

Since my true love's forsaken me.

CHORUS

Nae mair I'll hear wi' pleasure sing

The cheerfu' lav'rock in the Spring,

But sad in grief now I maun mourn,

Far, far frae her, o'er Logan-burn.

He gained the patronage of General Scott of Malleny, and dedicated to him Poems, chiefly in the Scottish dialect (Leith, 1819). Thomson also published A poem, chiefly in the Scottish dialect, on raising and selling the dead, and the melancholy spectacle which was presented to the inhabitants of Currie, on their taking two dead bodies from a cart in its way from Lanark to Edinburgh (Leith, 1821).

Thomson lived until 1832, in reasonable prosperity.

== Commemoration ==
The Kinleith Burn below Thomson's house has been named the "Poet's Burn", after James Thomson, the "Weaver Poet", and it runs down the steeply sloping "Poet's Glen" down to near Currie Kirk where it flows into the Water of Leith after passing under a bridge of the Water of Leith Walkway.

His cottage still stands at Mid Kinleith farm, with "Mount Parnassus" still inscribed over the entrance door.

== See also ==
- List of 18th-century British working-class writers
