= List of listed buildings in Tongland, Dumfries and Galloway =

This is a list of listed buildings in the civil parish of Tongland in Dumfries and Galloway, Scotland.

== List ==
Name	Location	Date Listed	Grid Ref. (Note: Sometimes known as OSGB36, the grid reference (where provided) is based on the British national grid reference system used by the Ordnance Survey. • "Guide to National Grid". Ordnance Survey. • "Get-a-map". Ordnance Survey.)	Geo-coordinates	Notes	LB Number (Note: Historic Environment Scotland assign a unique alphanumeric identifier to each designated site in Scotland, for listed buildings this always begins with "LB", for example "LB12345".)	Image
Tarff, Old Bridge Of Tarff				54°53′00″N 4°03′20″W	Category B	17084	Upload Photo
Kirkconnel Farmhouse And Steading				54°55′12″N 4°04′06″W	Category B	17118	Upload Photo
Argrennan House Walled Garden				54°53′57″N 4°00′14″W	Category B	43477	Upload Photo
Bogra House				54°52′35″N 4°01′22″W	Category B	17116	Upload Photo
Brook House, Ringford				54°53′50″N 4°02′44″W	Category B	17117	Upload Photo
Tongland Bridge				54°51′28″N 4°02′21″W	Category A	17125	Upload another image See more images
Tongland Parish Church (Church Of Scotland) And Churchyard				54°51′47″N 4°01′49″W	Category B	17127	Upload Photo
Argrennan House				54°54′03″N 4°00′22″W	Category A	17114	Upload another image
Low Bridge Of Tarff				54°51′51″N 4°03′02″W	Category B	17120	Upload Photo
Argrennan Lodge				54°54′07″N 4°00′37″W	Category B	17115	Upload Photo
Galloway Electric Power Scheme, Tongland Power Station, Surge Tower And Valve House, Including Boundary Walls				54°51′35″N 4°02′04″W	Category A	17126	Upload another image
Tongland, Old Tongland Bridge				54°51′38″N 4°01′54″W	Category A	17123	Upload Photo
Tongland Abbey, Tongland Parish Churchyard				54°51′47″N 4°01′50″W	Category B	17124	Upload Photo
Tarff, High Bridge Of Tarff				54°53′01″N 4°03′19″W	Category B	17119	Upload Photo

== Key ==
The scheme for classifying buildings in Scotland is:

- Category A: "buildings of national or international importance, either architectural or historic; or fine, little-altered examples of some particular period, style or building type."
- Category B: "buildings of regional or more than local importance; or major examples of some particular period, style or building type, which may have been altered."
- Category C: "buildings of local importance; lesser examples of any period, style, or building type, as originally constructed or moderately altered; and simple traditional buildings which group well with other listed buildings."

In March 2016 there were 47,288 listed buildings in Scotland. Of these, 8% were Category A, and 50% were Category B, with the remaining 42% being Category C.
