= Tongland =

Village in Scotland

Coordinates: 54.8637°N 4.0307°W

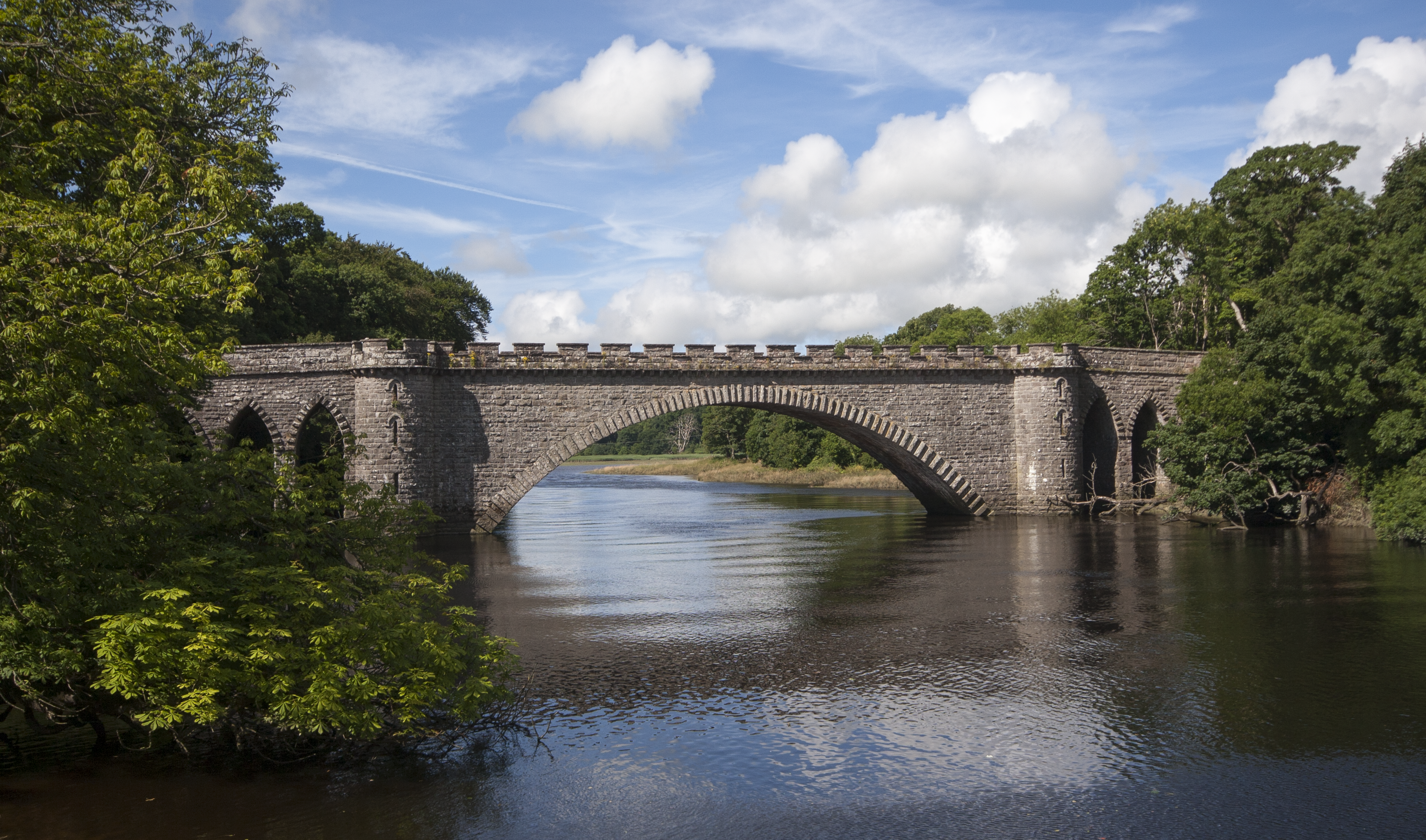
- Bridge over the River Dee designed by Thomas Telford, 1806.

- Location within Dumfries and Galloway
- OS grid reference: NX698536
- Council area: Dumfries and Galloway
- Lieutenancy area: Kirkcudbrightshire
- Country: Scotland
- Sovereign state: United Kingdom
- Post town: KIRKCUDBRIGHT
- Postcode district: DG6
- Police: Scotland
- Fire: Scottish
- Ambulance: Scottish
- UK Parliament: Dumfries and Galloway
- Scottish Parliament: Galloway and West Dumfries

Tongland, also spelt Tongueland (/tʌŋlənd/) is a small village about 2 miles (3 km) north of Kirkcudbright, in the historic county of Kirkcudbrightshire in Dumfries and Galloway, Scotland. It lies on the west bank of the Dee near its confluence with the Tarff Water.

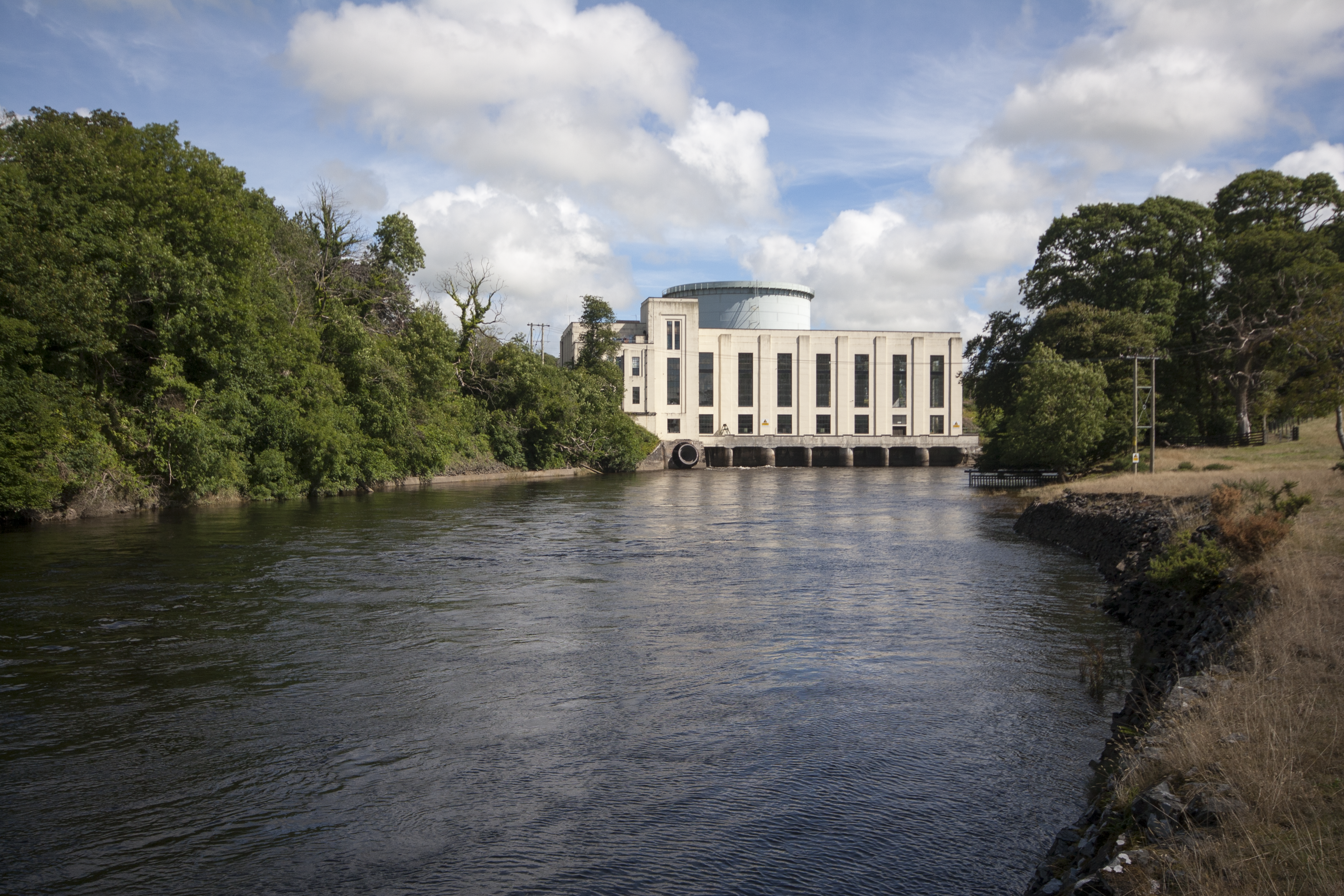
Tongland Power station

== History ==
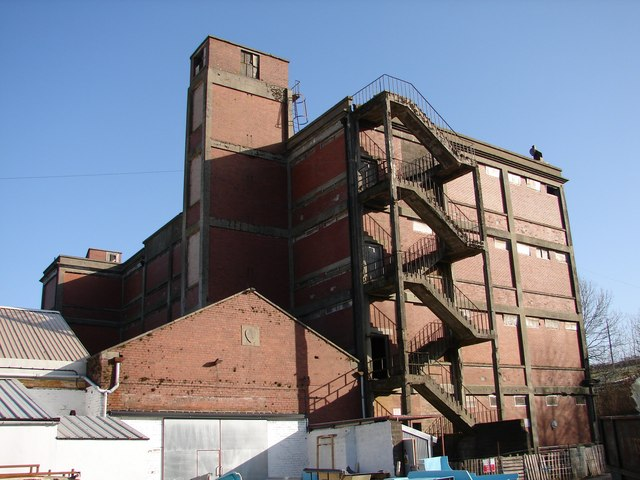
The factory where 'Galloway' cars were made

Tongland Abbey, a medieval Premonstratensian monastic community, existed here during the Middle Ages. The remains of Tongland Abbey are now within the churchyard just south of the main road. Tongland Church, built in 1813, is now disused and in a state of ruin, although the graveyard is still in use.

The Dee is crossed shortly downriver by Tongland Bridge, a stone arch bridge constructed in 1806 by civil engineer Thomas Telford. Telford was assisted in the Works by resident civil engineer, A Blane. There is also an earlier bridge dating to 1761 which is approximately 500 metres (550 yd) to the north-east.

Since the 1930s, Tongland has been the site of a hydro-electric power station, part of the Galloway Hydro Electric Scheme. The station used to be open to visitors during the summer months, since 2007 this has no longer been the case. Slightly earlier, between 1921 and 1922 'Galloway' cars were made in Tongland in a First World War factory staffed mainly by female apprentice engineers. The Galloway Engineering Company factory was originally completed in 1917 and was powered by its own hydro-electric scheme on the Dee.

Since 2004, there have been several construction projects, with the site of a former garage now home to three new houses. There are also several more houses being constructed. In 2006, street lights were installed along the A711 which passes through the village.

== Notable people ==
- Thomas Brown Tongland minister and Free Church moderator.
- Joe Dobson, co-founder of Interflora was born in Tongland in 1875.
- Campbell Cowan Edgar, Egyptologist and Secretary-General of the Egyptian Museum in Cairo, was born in Tongland in 1870

== See also ==
- List of listed buildings in Tongland, Dumfries and Galloway
