= John Forbes (minister of St Paul's, Glasgow) =

Scottish minister

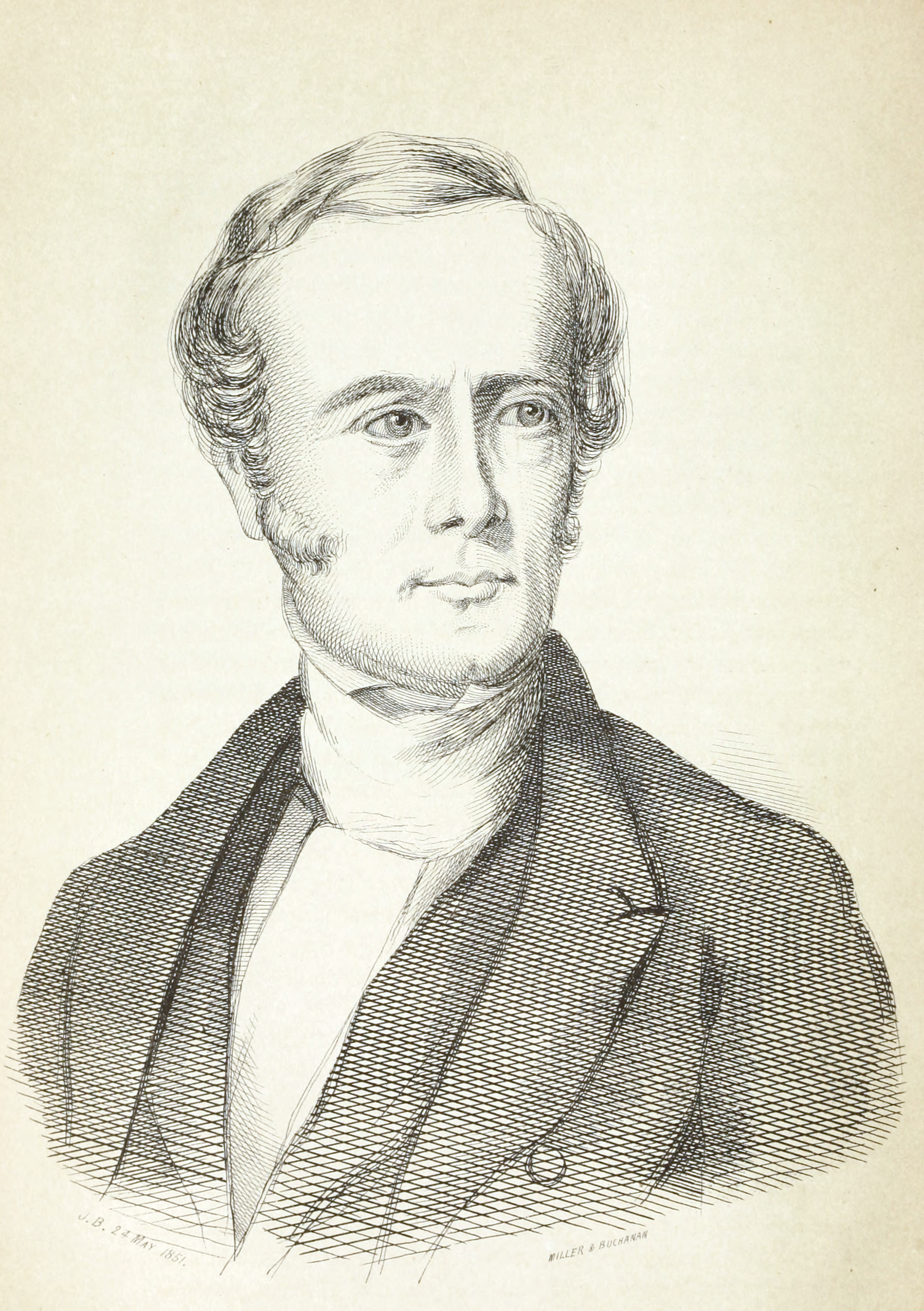
- John Forbes from Our Scottish Clergy
- Church: St. John's, Glasgow

Personal details
- Born: 1800 Dunkeld, Scotland
- Died: 25 December 1874 (aged 73–74)
- Denomination: Presbyterian
- Education: Perth Academy and St Andrews University

minister of Hope Park Chapel, Newington
- In office 16 November 1826 – 18 December 1828

minister of St Paul's Parish Church, Glasgow
- In office 18 December 1828 – 19 May 1843

minister of St Paul's Free Church, Glasgow
- In office 1843 – 25 December 1874

John Forbes (1800 – 25 December 1874) was a Presbyterian minister who served in St Paul's Church in Glasgow. After several years in the Church of Scotland, he left at the Disruption and joined the Free Church of Scotland.

== Life ==
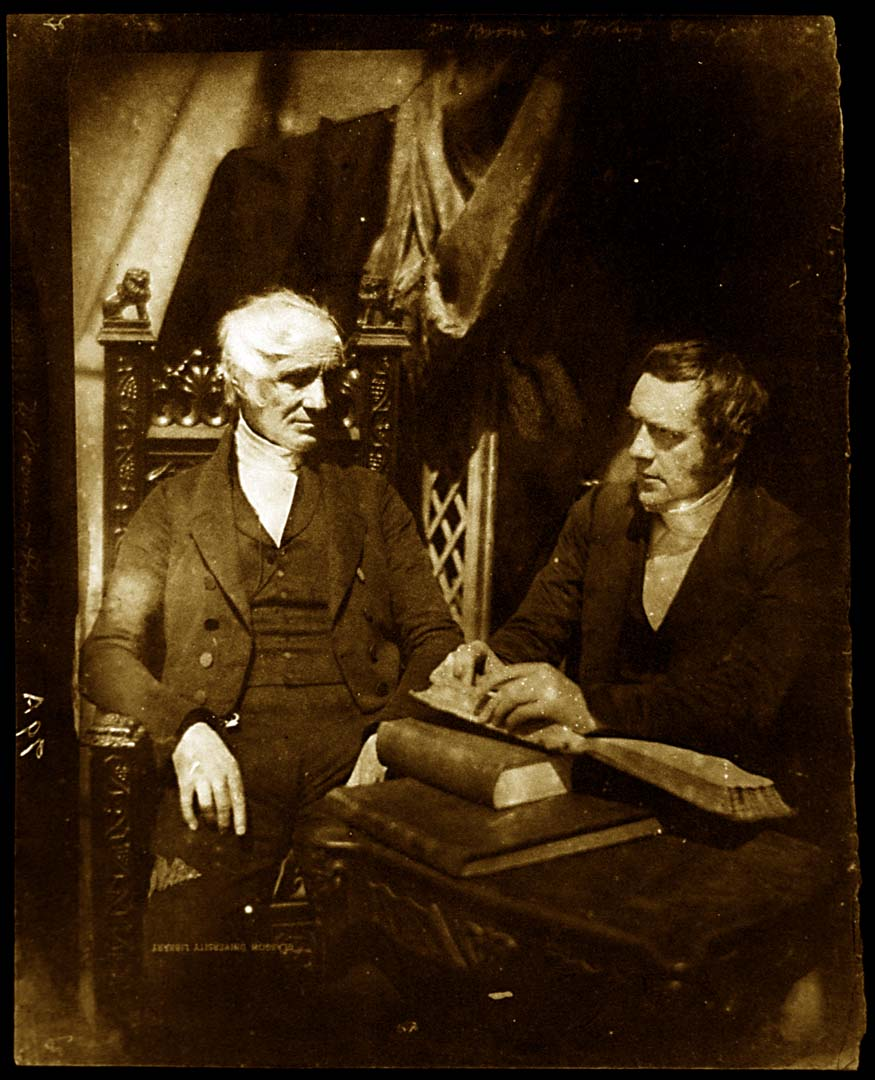
Dr Thomas Brown and Rev Dr John Forbes

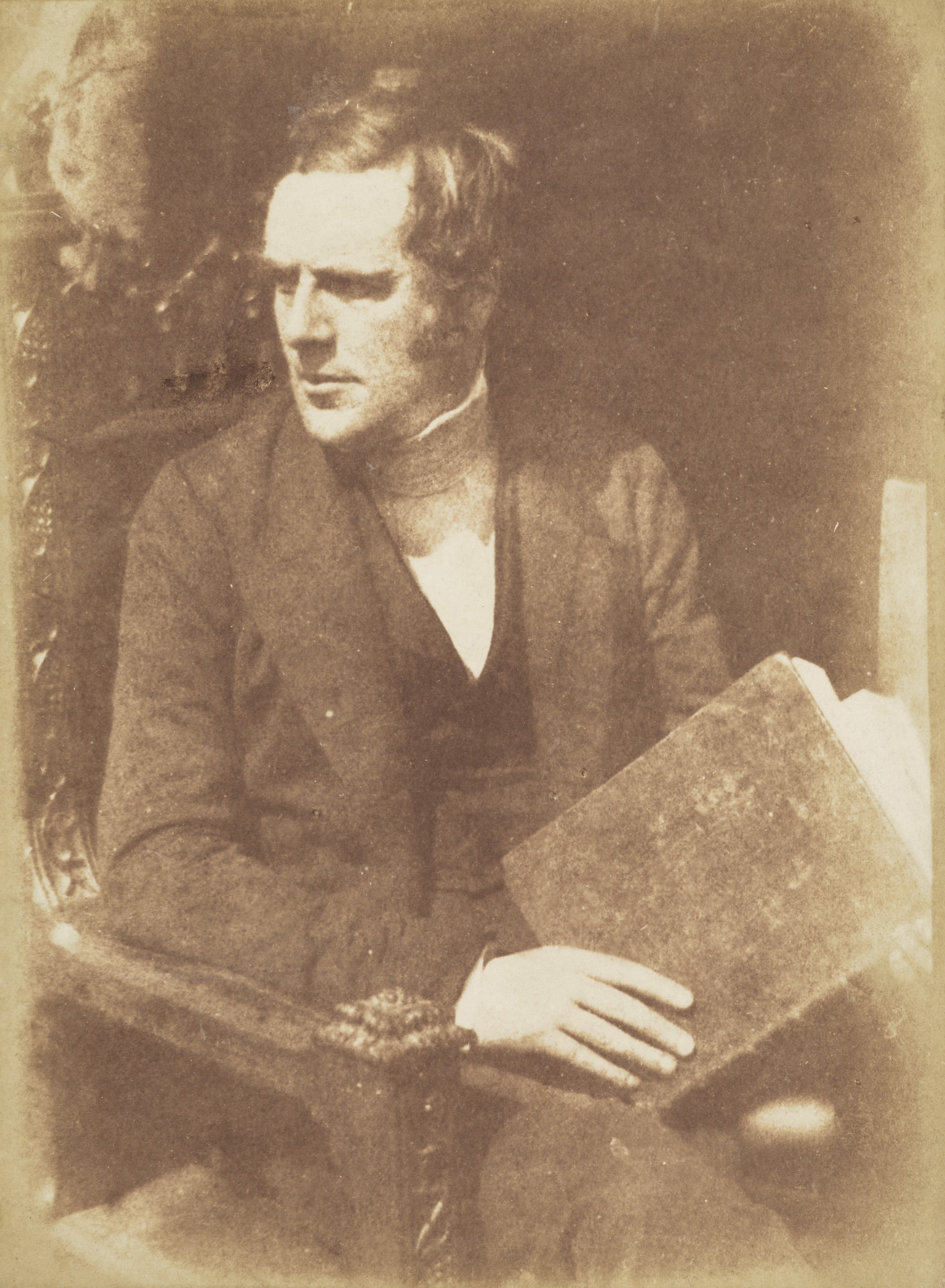
John Forbes by Hill & Adamson

John Forbes was born in Dunkeld in 1800. In 1828 he was educated at Perth Academy and St Andrews University. After graduation he was for sometime employed as a mathematical tutor in Perth Academy. Forbes was licensed by the Presbytery of Perth on 27 April 1825. He was subsequently ordained to Hope Park Chapel (Newington), Edinburgh, on 16 November 1826. In this role Forbes succeeded Robert Gordon whom he had previously succeeded as mathematics master in Perth Academy. He later moved to Glasgow being presented by Magistrates and Council on 10 September, and translated, and admitted on 18 December 1828.

He was awarded a doctorate degree (D.D.) from the University of St Andrews, on 15 April 1837. He also received an LL.D. degree from Glasgow University, on 18 December 1840.

At the Disruption he joined the Free Church in 1843 and served as minister of St Paul's Free Church, from 1843 to 1874. He was a member of the Assembly of 1863, made a long speech on the Union question, and accepted a place on the Committee. Afterwards, when he and some of his brethren came to believe that union with the United Presbyterians could not be achieved but by the relinquishment of one of the fundamental principles of the Free Church, he felt that he had no alternative but to withdraw from the Committee. He died unmarried, on 25 December 1874.

== Publications ==
- The Theory of the Differential and Integral Calculus (Glasgow, 1837)
- Three Sermons on the Lord's Day (1831)
- Lectures I. (On the Headship of Christ), II. (The Jews), XL (On Infidelity), XII. (On the Evidences)
- On the Social and Physical Condition of the People
