= Currie, Edinburgh =

Suburb of Edinburgh, Scotland

Coordinates: 55.8960°N 3.3074°W

Currie
- Coat of arms of Currie

- Location within the City of Edinburgh council area Location within Scotland
- Population: 7,494 (2011)
- OS grid reference: NT182677
- Council area: City of Edinburgh
- Country: Scotland
- Sovereign state: United Kingdom
- Post town: CURRIE
- Postcode district: EH14
- Dialling code: 0131
- Police: Scotland
- Fire: Scottish
- Ambulance: Scottish
- UK Parliament: Edinburgh South West
- Scottish Parliament: Edinburgh Pentlands

Currie is a village and suburb on the outskirts of Edinburgh, Scotland, situated 7 miles (11 kilometres) south west of the city centre. Formerly within the County of Midlothian, it now falls within the jurisdiction of the City of Edinburgh Council. It is situated between Juniper Green to the northeast and Balerno to the southwest. It gives its name to a civil parish.

In 2001, the population of Currie was 8,550 and it contained 3,454 houses.

== Etymology ==
The name is recorded from 1210 onwards under various spellings such as Curey, Cory, Curri with Currie in 1402.

There is no accepted derivation of the name Currie but it is possibly from the Scottish Gaelic word curagh/curragh, a wet or boggy plain, or from the Brythonic word curi, a dell or muddy depression. These two proposed roots are cognate. The neighbouring suburb of Balerno derives its name from Scottish Gaelic, whilst the nearby Pentland Hills derive their name from Brythonic, so either is possible.

== History ==
The earliest record of a settlement in the Currie area is a Bronze Age razor (1800 BC) found at Kinleith Mill and the stone cists (500 BC) at Duncan's Belt and Blinkbonny. There are a few mentions of this area in medieval and early modern documents. One of the first is when Robert of Kildeleith became Chancellor of Scotland in 1249. Kildeleith means Chapel by the Leith, and survives today as Kinleith. Robert the Bruce gave Riccarton as a wedding present in 1315 and in 1392 the land passed to the family of Bishop Wardlaw. In 1612 the land went to Ludovic Craig, a Senator of the College of Justice. In 1818 it passed to the female line and became the property of the Gibson-Craigs.

There has been a Christian community in the area for more than 1,000 years. In 1018, the archdeacons of Lothian set up their headquarters in the area. John Bartholomew's Civic and Ecclesiastical maps of the 13th century do not show Currie, but the Index of Charters 1309-1413 records Currie as being 'favourite hunting grounds' for the Lords and Knights of Edinburgh Castle. A settlement began to take shape around Currie Kirk and the main Lanark Road, which was the main route south and continues to be known as 'The Lang Whang'.

The weaver poet James Thomson was brought up in the village in the late 18th century and is commemorated by the dell of the Kinleith Burn being named the "Poet's Glen", where it runs down from beside his cottage at Mid Kinleith Farm to join the Water of Leith, and also by a number of street names, (Thomson Road, Thomson Drive, Thomson Crescent), in the east of Currie.

The war memorial was erected in 1919 to a design by Sir Robert Lorimer.

The period 1921-1951 brought great changes with the building of more council houses in Currie and private building along Lanark Road. Wider scale development began in the late 1950s and early 1960s with the construction of a private housing estate to the east of Curriehill Road. House builders began to promote Currie as a pleasant commuting suburb of Edinburgh and much house building took place to the north of Lanark Road West. Currie High School was constructed on its present site in 1966 and extensively refurbished and renewed in 1997. There was a Currie station on a short loop railway running over what is now the Water of Leith Walkway. The physical topography has ensured that the original historic core to the south of Lanark Road West including the Water of Leith has remained undeveloped. In March 1972 the historic centre of Currie was declared a Conservation Area.

== Education ==
The earliest record of education in the area is contained in the Minutes of Edinburgh Town Council in 1598, when Baillie Lawrence Henderson was sent to "the toun o Currie to help the gentlemen of the Parish select a Schoolmaister"; however it is not stated where the school was situated. In 1694, the heritors appointed a Mr Thomson to teach scholars in the Church until Thomas Craig of Riccarton found a place for the building of a school and house for the schoolmaster. The foundations of the school were laid in 1699. The school and school house cost 500 merks and the salary of the schoolmaster was 20 pounds Scots per year.

Currie is served by Currie High School (which has been a Green Flag Eco-School since 2004), Nether Currie Primary School and Currie Primary School, formed by an amalgamation in 2005 of Curriehill Primary School and Riccarton Primary School which shared neighbouring campuses. The largest single year group since the school's inception was 1984. According to the school website this number will probably never be equalled or exceeded. CHS sought to improve facilities with the additions of all weather, floodlit football pitches around 2000. In August 2025 the newly build Currie Community High School was opened to pupils. It is one of the first schools in Scotland to be constructed to Passivhaus standards, and sits on the site of the original school pitches. The original school buildings are in the process of being demolished and replaced with outdoor pitches and athletics facilities.

From the 1970s onwards, Heriot-Watt University moved from its city centre location to occupy the lands of the former Riccarton Estate, gifted to the university by Midlothian County Council in 1966. The move has now been completed and the main campus of Heriot-Watt University occupies and manages a wooded area with enough space for future expansion.

== Sport ==
=== Football ===
Currie has one youth football team called Currie Football Club (Currie Star Football Club play their games in the Kingsknowe area of Edinburgh). Oriam, Scotland's national performance centre for sport is located on the Heriot Watt University Campus, which has been used by both the Scottish Football Association and Heart of Midlothian F.C.

=== Rugby ===
Currie has one rugby team, Currie RFC who are based and play their home games in the neighbouring village of Balerno.

== Culture and attractions ==
Currie has two Scout Groups - the 31st Pentland which has run continuously since 1924 and the 42nd Pentland.

Currie is a District of Girlguiding Edinburgh. 1st Currie Guides have run continuously since 1921, and 1st Currie Brownies continually since 1933.

On the first Saturday of May The Currie Riding of the Marches takes place.

== Local History Society ==
Currie and District Local History Society meets 12 times a year and has speakers on all aspects of the area.

The society meets every first and third Monday in the month and their year starts in October. The venue is in the Gibson Craig Hall on the Lanark Road in Currie.

== Media ==
C&B News – originally Currie & Balerno News – is a monthly volunteer-run “local community news magazine” (available in print and as a downloadable PDF) covering Currie and neighbouring Balerno, Juniper Green, Baberton Mains and Colinton. Originally launched in February 1976, and published 10 times a year, the magazine features local news and articles, contributions from local political representatives, and updates on local planning issues—all voluntarily submitted by local residents. The magazine published its 500th issue in October 2024and celebrated its 50th anniversary in February 2026.

A bespoke edition of the “lifestyle and community magazine” Konect is delivered to households in Currie as well as neighbouring Balerno, Juniper Green, Baberton Mains and Ratho.

== Demographics ==
Ethnicity	Currie	Edinburgh
White	92.6%	91.7%
Asian	3.8%	5.5%
Black	2.3%	1.2%
Mixed	0.5%	0.9%
Other	0.8%	0.8%

== Transport ==
The A70 runs through the area and Currie is serviced by the 32, 44 and 45 bus routes, which are operated by Lothian Buses. Currie is served by rail by Curriehill railway station on the Glasgow-Edinburgh via Shotts Line. Currie is also close to the City of Edinburgh bypass and is bordered by the Union Canal to the north and the Water of Leith to the south. Edinburgh Airport is located approximately 4 miles (6 kilometres) north of Currie and the M8 motorway to Glasgow is around 2 miles (3 kilometres) north. It also has connections to Livingston in West Lothian through E&M Horsburgh service 24, between Juniper Green and Livingston.

== Currie Kirk ==
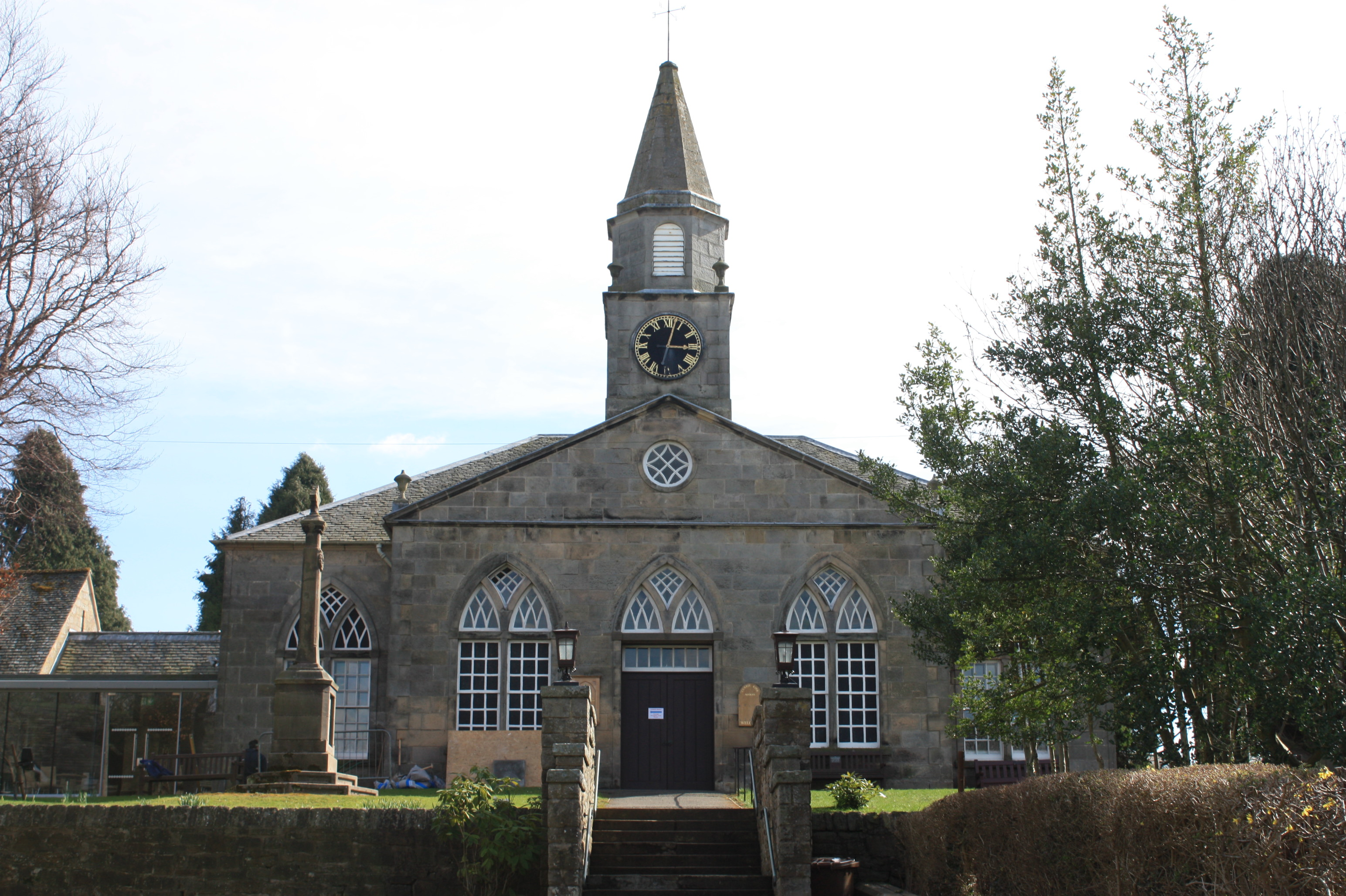
Currie Kirk and war memorial

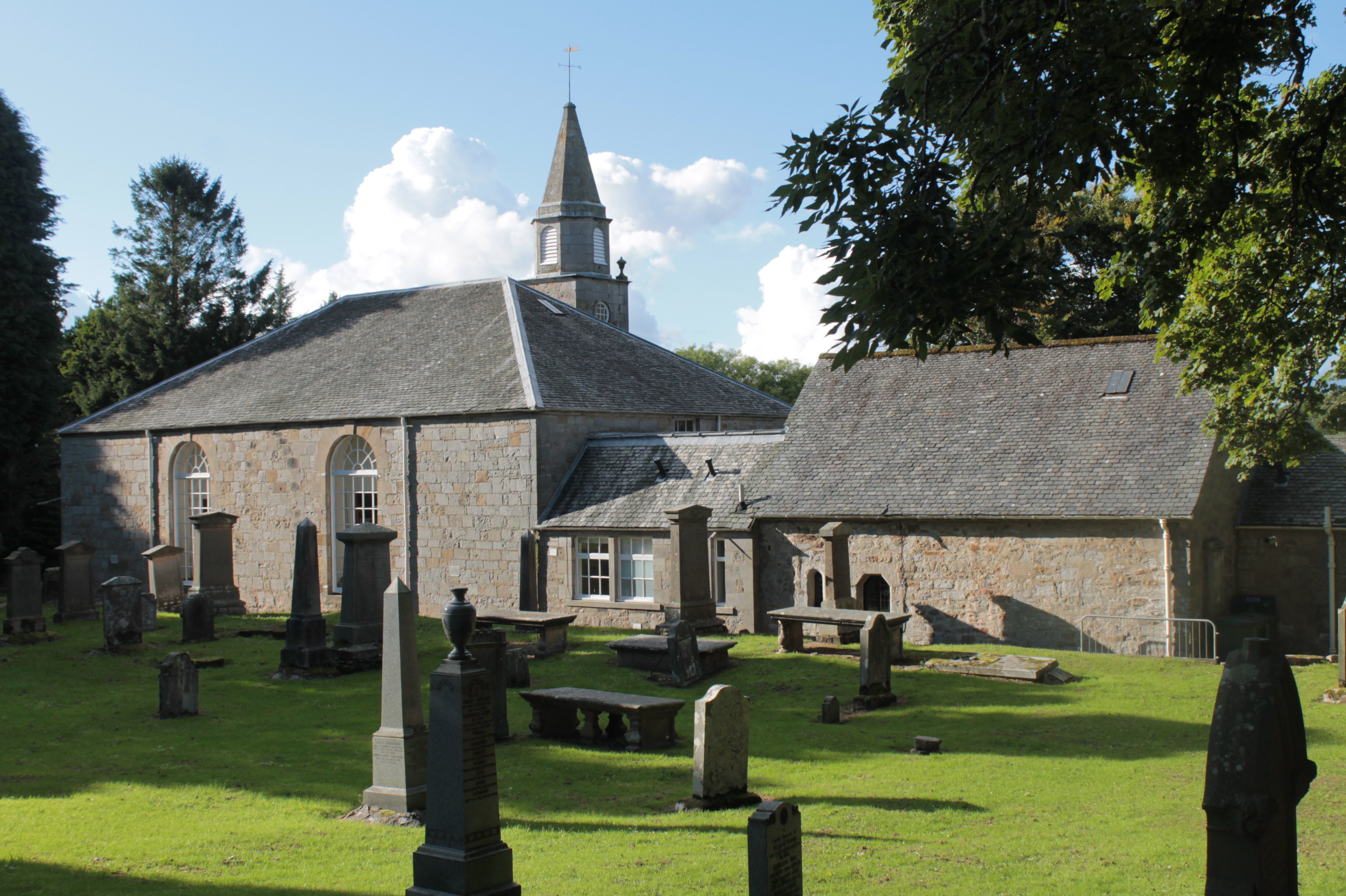
Currie Kirk from rear

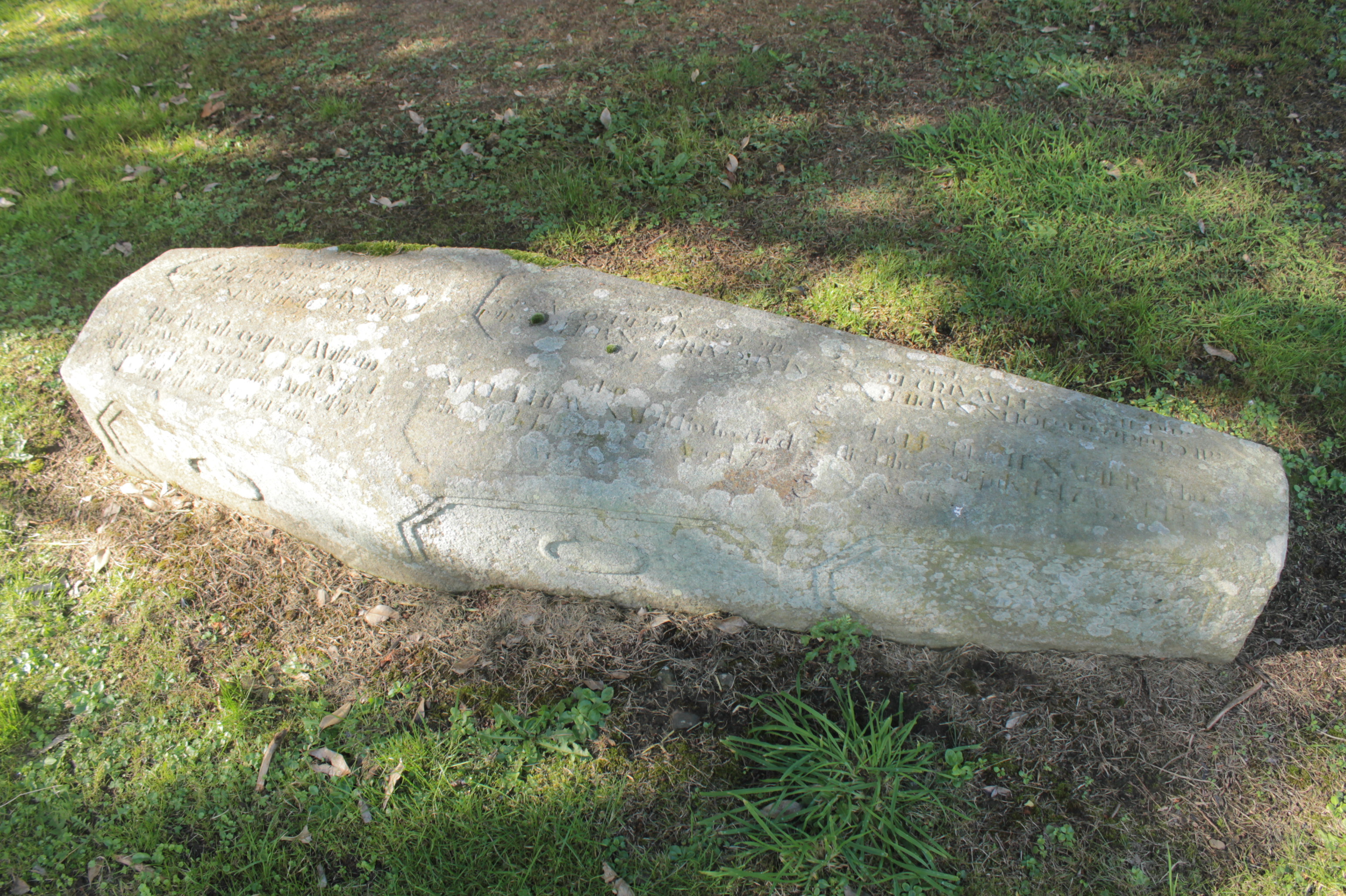
Coffin gravestone, 1751, Currie churchyard

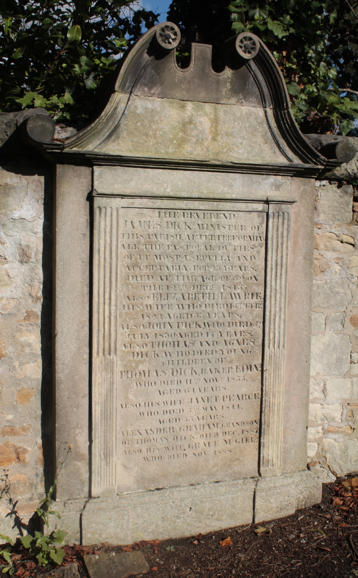
The grave of Rev James Dick, Currie churchyard

The pre-Reformation church was dedicated to St Mungo and was under the control of the Archdeaconry of Lothian.

The parish church lies south of the current main road, amongst a small cluster of buildings which represent the original village. It was built in a simple rectangular form, with a pediment on its north (entrance) side and a low central spire, in 1784 by James Thompson of Leith. Its interior was remodelled in 1835 by the Edinburgh architect, David Bryce, and in 1848 the windows were enlarged by the architect David Cousin. As the graveyard pre-dates the church it is presumed that the church replaced an earlier church.

The graveyard is laid out in three sections: an original section around the church including several interesting carved stones from the 17th and 18th centuries; a Victorian section on a raised tier; and an attached, but separately walled cemetery to the south, containing 20th century graves. The lower section contains a coffin shaped stone to the Napier family dated 1751. This rare form is also found in Ratho churchyard to the north-west.

The war memorial. which adopts the form of a medieval market cross, stands near the entrance to the church. It was designed by Sir Robert Lorimer and added in 1921.

Below the site of the church close to the Water of Leith is St Mungo's Holy Well with its stone basin and side walls.

=== Ministers ===
- 1568 to 1591 - Adam Lichton (brother of Bishop Robert Leighton)
- 1591 to 1631 - Matthew Lichton, his son
- 1631 to 1668 - John Charteris MA son of Henry Charteris
- 1668 to 1689 - James Scrymgeour MA
- 1691 to 1700 - Henry Hamilton MA
- 1701 to 1713 - Robert Taylor
- 1713 to 1717 - Mungo Clarkson
- 1719 to 1739 - John Spark drowned in the Water of Leith in 1739
- 1740 to 1751 - David Moubray
- 1752 to 1792 - James Craig (1721-1792) previously a master at George Heriot's School. Eloped with Mary Buntine, a Quaker in 1744.
- 1793 to 1815 - James Dick, previously tutor to Adam Duncan, Admiral Duncan
- 1816 to 1837 - John Somerville (1774-1837) inventor of the safety catch on firearms
- 1837 to 1844 - Robert Jamieson Moderator in 1872
- 1844 to 1858 - Thomas Barclay MA became Principal of Glasgow University
- 1859 to 1898 - James Langwill DD (1824-1898)
- 1898 to ? - David Caldwell Stewart

=== Notable Interments ===
- Alick Buchanan-Smith, Baron Balerno (1898-1984)
- Alick Laidlaw Buchanan-Smith MP (1932-1991)
- Sir Stanley Davidson (1894-1981) Professor of Medicine
- William Henderson (1766-1842) co-founder of Scottish Widows (large obelisk to the north-west of the churchyard)
- Dr Robert Cranston Low MD FRCPE FRSE (1879-1949) medical author
- Dr Alexander Morison (1779-1866)
- Sir David Ferguson Ochterlony (1848-1931) 3rd Baronet Ochterlony
- Sir George Adam Smith (1856-1942) including a memorial to his daughter, Janet Adam Smith
- Brigadier General Ernest Craig Brown, who gives his name to the military march "Captain Craig Brown"

== Famous residents ==
- Stephen Carter, Baron Carter of Barnes
- Jamie Dick - Youth Olympic Gold Medalist in Curling
- Kate Green - Labour MP
- Dougal Haston - pioneer of Scottish mountaineering
- John Henry Maitland Moir - Archimandrite, Greek Orthodox Church of St Andrew
- Rev Alexander Ranken born and raised in Currie
- Peter Sawkins - Great British Bake Off Winner Series 11
- Matt Scott - Scottish international Rugby Union player
- James Thomson (weaver poet)
- Paul Research and John Mackie of post-punk band The Scars

== See also ==
- Heriot-Watt University
- Currie High School
