= St John's Renfield Church =

- The Parish Church of St John's Renfield Church
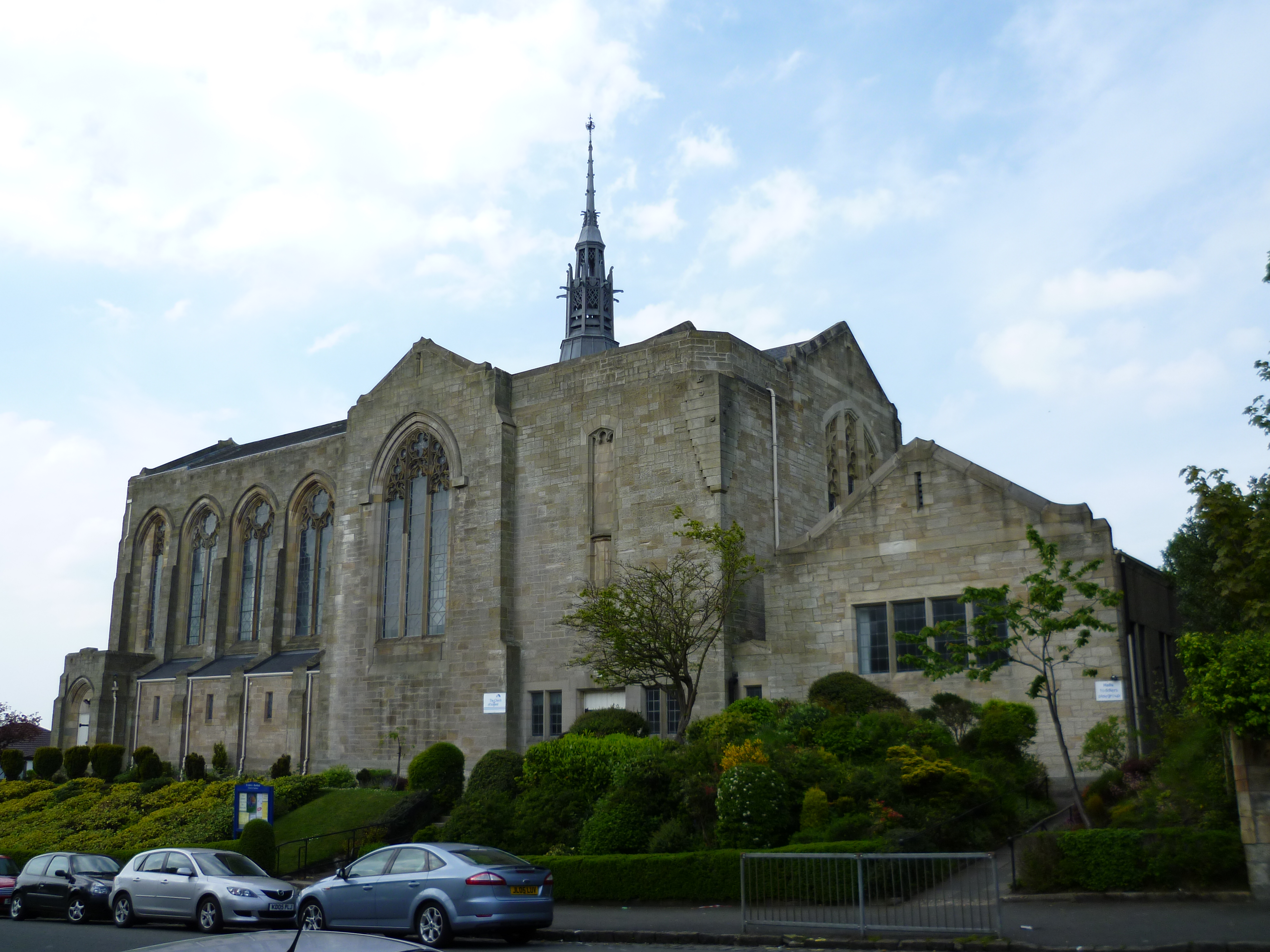
- The church seen from Beaconsfield Road
- St John's Renfield Church
- 55°53′10″N 4°18′24″W
- Location: Glasgow
- Country: Scotland
- Denomination: Church of Scotland
- Website: Church website

History
- Status: Active
- Dedicated: January 1931

Architecture
- Functional status: Parish church
- Architect: James Taylor Thomson
- Architectural type: Cruciform Church
- Style: Neo-Gothic
- Years built: 1929-1930

Administration
- Parish: St John's Renfield

Listed Building – Category B
- Designated: 15 December 1970
- Reference no.: LB32301

St. John's Renfield Church is a parish church of the Church of Scotland, serving Kelvindale in the west end of Glasgow, Scotland. It is within the Church of Scotland's Presbytery of Glasgow.

== Location ==
The church building is situated in Beaconsfield Road, Kelvindale (within the G12 postcode area). The church is visible from the Great Western Road. Gartnavel General Hospital, Gartnavel Royal Hospital and the Glasgow Nuffield Hospital are located nearby.

== History ==
The history of the present St John's Renfield Church has its roots in three separate congregations reflecting the ecclesiastical, industrial and demographic fortunes of nineteenth and twentieth century Scotland.

=== St John's Parish Church ===
The opening phase in the story dates back to 1819. Glasgow like other industrial towns was confronted with the appalling, overcrowded and insanitary living conditions engendered by the rapidly increasing population. A new Church, St John's Parish Church, was built on the north side of Bell Street facing down Macfarlane Street, where it stood until demolished in the 1960s, to serve the deprived Calton area.

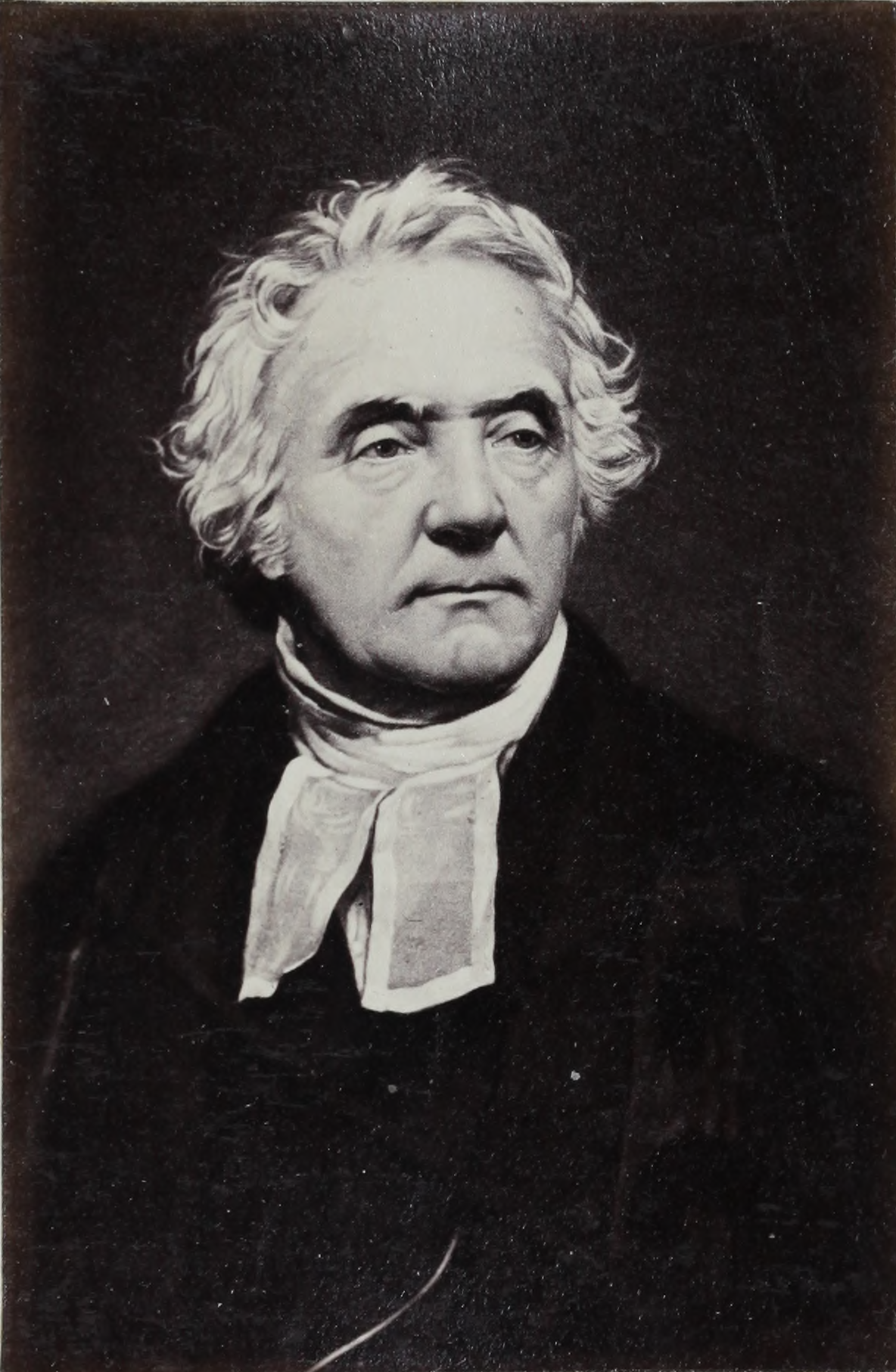
Thomas Chalmers. Minister at St John's Parish Church. (1819 - 1823)

Its first minister was the young Dr Thomas Chalmers who already had a considerable reputation as moral reformer and evangelical preacher and whose leadership during the Disruption in 1843 was to make him, in the words of Carlyle, "The chief Scotsman of his age." Chalmers had managed to persuade the Provost and Magistrates to appoint him as Minister to the new church in order to allow him to put into practice his unorthodox, evangelical ideas for alleviating the material and spiritual squalor generated by industrialism. Thanks to this approach, which became a model in its time, he hoped to bring about a moral change by fostering independence and by privileging personal contact, parochial care and schooling. Chalmers' Ministry had considerable success but was relatively short, for, in 1823, he was appointed to the chair of moral philosophy at St Andrews University. He was replaced first by Dr Patrick MacFarlan, and then by Dr Thomas Brown and the Church continued to prosper with a growing congregation until the great schism caused over the issue of "spiritual independence" and "patronage" which led to the Disruption and the creation of the new independent Free Church of Scotland*. On 14 May 1843, Dr Brown preached his last sermon in Macfarlane Street, and then, with the support of 1151 out of 1175 members of the congregation, left the church. Three days later, a new congregation was formed under the name of "Free St John's". Initially, without a place of worship, the congregation found a temporary location in Blackfriar's street, until, thanks to a subscription, sufficient funds were collected for a new Church to be built in George street in 1845, where "Free St John's" continued to prosper until 1922.

=== Renfield Church ===
In the same year, 1819, a few hundred yards away new congregation was formed. It was a lay overflow congregation from the "Old Light Church" in East Cromwell Street, consisting of some 30 members and led by two elders: a weaver and a currier. The first services were held in rented accommodation in Albion Street, until the acquisition of a permanent site in Renfield Street in 1820 by which time the congregation had grown to 236. The Renfield Church, as it came to be known, was formed to meet the needs of the western suburbs and Calton. For two years, until the appointment of the Rev. Michael Willis in 1821, there was no permanent minister. The membership of the congregation continued to rise slowly, however, it was decided in 1855, because of shifting patterns of residence, to sell the Renfield site and move westwards. A new Church was built in Bath Street with seating for 1200. After the death of the Rev Duncan MacNab, the Ministry remained vacant for a period of 12 months. Finally, and despite the reticence of some of the more intransigent purists of the congregation, Dr Marcus Dods was inducted in 1864. This resulted in a memorable Ministry and made Renfield's name as a centre for religious life in Glasgow. Again, because of population shifts, it was decided that it would be advantageous for the congregations of Free St John's and Renfield to unite, which was finally accomplished in 1923. As the Renfield church was both more modern and more convenient, it was this building that was adopted to house the new congregation, "Free St John's – Renfield". In 1924, the Rev. G. H. C. Macgregor was inducted as Minister.

=== The Hyndland Congregation ===
A few miles to the East, a third congregation had evolved, under the name of "The Hyndland Congregation". It was originally formed in 1852 when the Wellington Street congregation changed location. It was a small congregation of about 30 laymen which, finally in 1853, was taken in hand by the Rev. William Miller. More suitable accommodation was found in Cheapside street in 1856 and the congregation, whose membership had by this time increased to 100 was dedicated under the name of "Mitchel U.P. Church". Following the appointment of the new Minister, Dr John Wilson in 1861, there was a rapid rise in membership and, in 1873, a new site with seating for 1000 was opened in Breadalbane Street under the name of "Sandyford U.P. Church". At the request of the Presbytery however, the Church moved West to serve the developing areas of Hyndland . The project to build a new Church in Novar Drive was blocked by WW1. After the war it was decided to unite with "St John's – Renfield" and so a new congregation was formed, the "St John's Renfield and Hyndland congregation" in 1927. The Church was transported ( i.e. relocated) to the new Church building in Beaconsfield road in 1931.

== Building ==
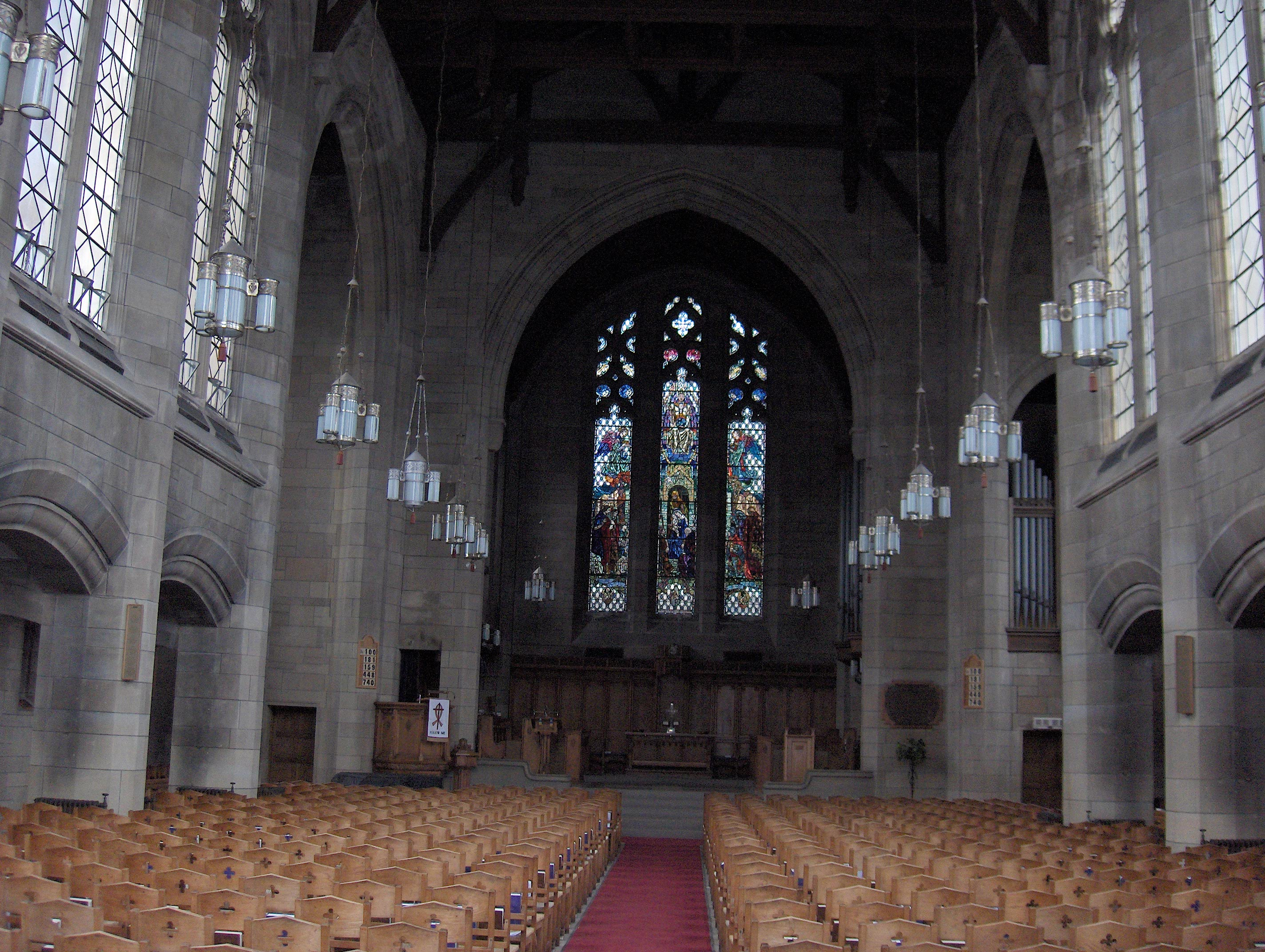
Interior of St John's Renfield Church

The church was dedicated in January 1931. The new building was planned by the United Free Church of Scotland, but by the time of completion the UF Church had already united (in 1929) with the Church of Scotland. On 15 December 1970 the church was designated as a Category B listed building.

The church was designed in a Gothic revival style by the architect James Taylor Thomson (1887–1953). He won the competition to design the church in 1927; it was built between 1929 and 1930. Thomson's wedding took place in the church in 1931. The church also includes elaborate oak carvings and stained glass by Douglas Strachan and Gordon Webster. Also in Glasgow, Thomson designed High Carntyne Parish Church and was involved in designing the chapel of the University of Glasgow and much of the 1937 Empire Exhibition site in Bellahouston Park.

== Ministry ==
=== The present day ===
The minister (since 2009) is the Rev Fiona Lillie, who was previously minister at Stromness Parish Church, Orkney. The previous minister, the Rev Dugald Cameron, is now minister in Oban.

A former minister (1966–1976) was the Very Rev Dr James A. Simpson, who subsequently moved to Dornoch Cathedral and became Moderator of the General Assembly of the Church of Scotland in 1994. His successor was the Rev Colin McIntosh, who subsequently became minister of Dunblane Cathedral (in 1988).

The Very Rev Dr Sheilagh M. Kesting, the first woman minister to be Moderator of the General Assembly of the Church of Scotland, was a Probationer for the Ministry at St John's Renfield (prior to being ordained and inducted to Overtown Parish Church in Lanarkshire).

=== Ministers: 1821 to the present day ===
Years of service	Minister	Subsequent responsibilities
	ST JOHN'S PARISH CHURCH (1819–1843)	
1819–1823	Dr Thomas Chalmers	Moderator of the Gen. Assembly of the Church of Scotland (1832); Prof. Theology, University of Edinburgh (1838); Leader of the Disruption; First Moderator of the Free Church of Scotland (1843)
1824–1826	Dr Patrick MacFarlan	Moderator of the Church of Scotland (1834) Moderator of the Free Church of Scotland (1845)
1826–1843	Dr Thomas Brown	Moderator of the Free Church of Scotland (October 1843)
	FREE ST JOHN'S CHURCH (1843–1922)	
1843–1847	Dr Thomas Brown	Moderator of the Free Church of Scotland (October 1843)
1847–1880	Dr John Roxburgh	Moderator of the Free Church of Scotland (1867)
1881–1882	Dr George Cameron (Associate Minister)	Prof. Old Testament, Aberdeen University (1882)
1883–1922	Dr John Carroll	
	RENFIELD CHURCH (1819–1922)	
1821–1847	Dr Michael Willis	Prof. Divinity, subsequently Principal of Knox College, Toronto (1857)
1848–1855	Dr John Bonar	
1856–1863	Rev. Duncan MacNab	
1864–1889	Dr Marcus Dods	Prof. New Testament Exegis subsequently Principal of New College, Edinburgh (1907)
1890–1898	Dr W. M. Macgregor	Principal Free Church College, Glasgow (1928) Moderator of the United Free Church Gen. Assembly (1919)
1899–1911	Dr Patrick Carnegie Simpson	Prof. Church History, Westminster College, Cambridge (1914) Moderator of the Gen. Assembly of the Presbyterian Church of England (1928)
1911–1923	Rev. John Fraser	
	HYNDLAND CHURCH (1852–1926)	
1852	Lay congregation	
1853–1860	Rev. William Miller	
1861–1895	Dr John Wilson	
1896–1926	Rev. W.A. Paton	
	ST JOHN'S – RENFIELD CHURCH (Union of St John's and Renfield 1819–1843)	
1923–1928	Dr G. H. C. Macgregor	Professor of New Testament History, Glasgow University (1933)
	ST JOHN'S – RENFIELD CHURCH (Union of Free St John's, Renfield and Hyndland 1929–?)	
1929–1952	Rev. James A. Campbell	
1953–1965	Rev. James G. K. Brotheron	
1966–1976	Rev. James A. Simpson	Moderator of the Gen. Assembly of the Church of Scotland (1994)
1977–1988	Rev. Colin McIntosh	
1989–1998	Rev. John Webster	
1989–2008	Rev. Dugald Cameron	
2009–	Rev. Fiona Lillie	

== See also ==
- List of Church of Scotland parishes

=== Other churches nearby ===
- Kelvin Stevenson Memorial Church (Church of Scotland)
- Kelvinside Hillhead Parish Church (Church of Scotland)
- Knightswood St. Margaret's Parish Church (Church of Scotland)
- Jordanhill Parish Church (Church of Scotland)
- St. Luke's Cathedral (Orthodox)
- St. Mary's Cathedral (Episcopalian)
- St. Bride's Church (Episcopalian)
- Wellington Church (Church of Scotland)
