= David Brown (Free Church of Scotland) =

Scottish professor of theology and minister

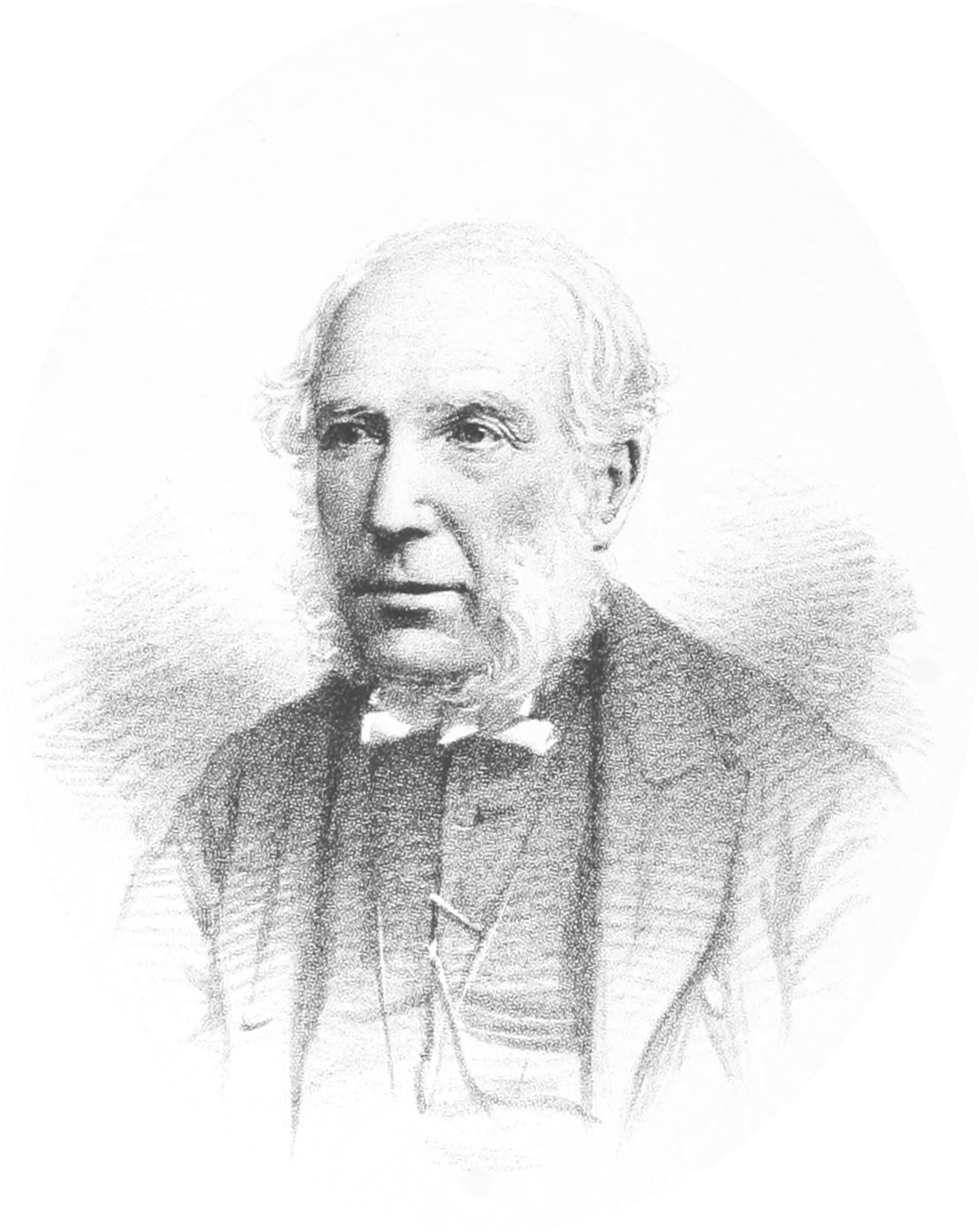
- David Brown from Disruption Worthies

Personal details
- Born: 17 August 1803
- Died: 3 July 1897 (aged 93)

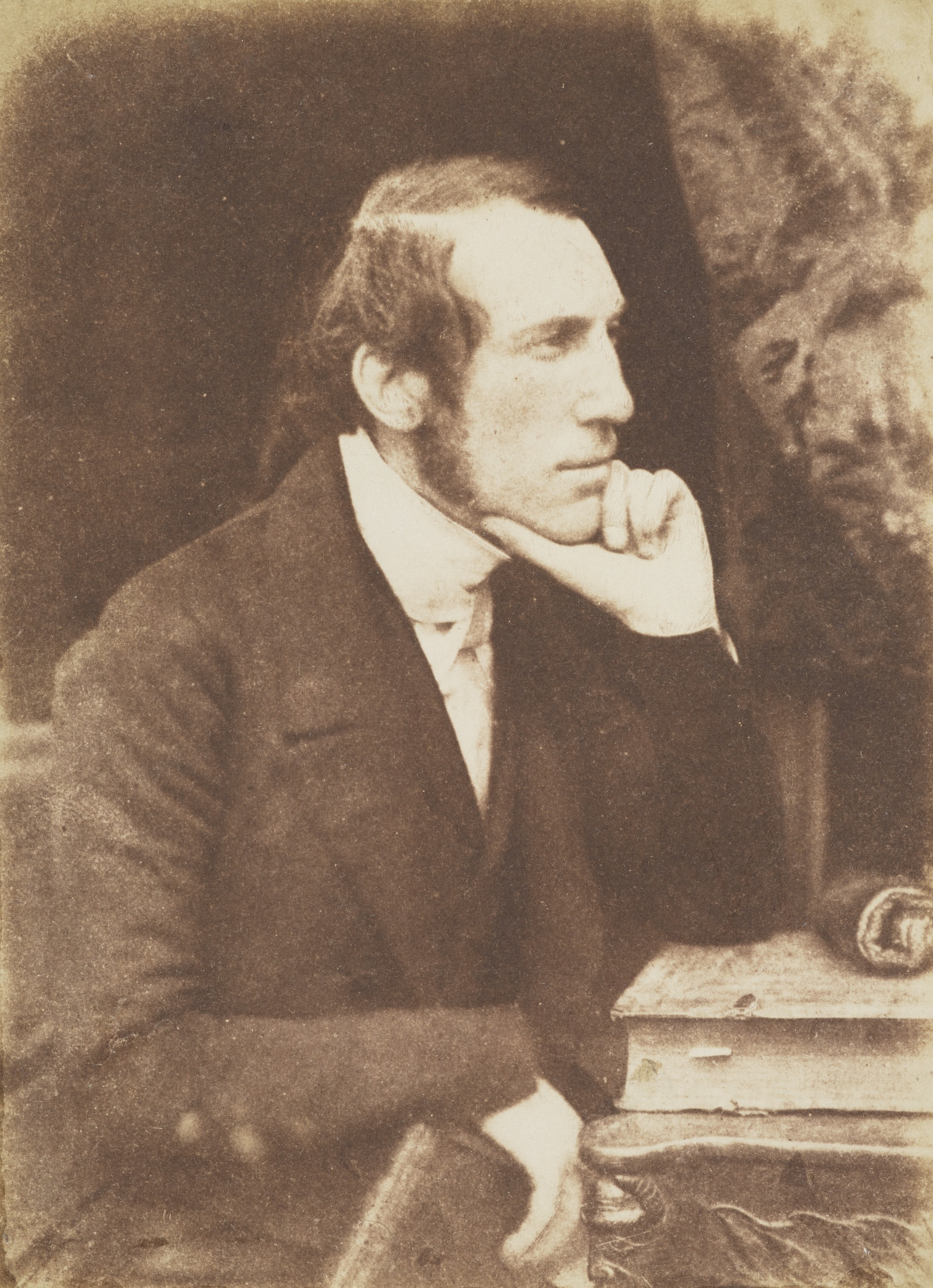
David Brown by Hill & Adamson

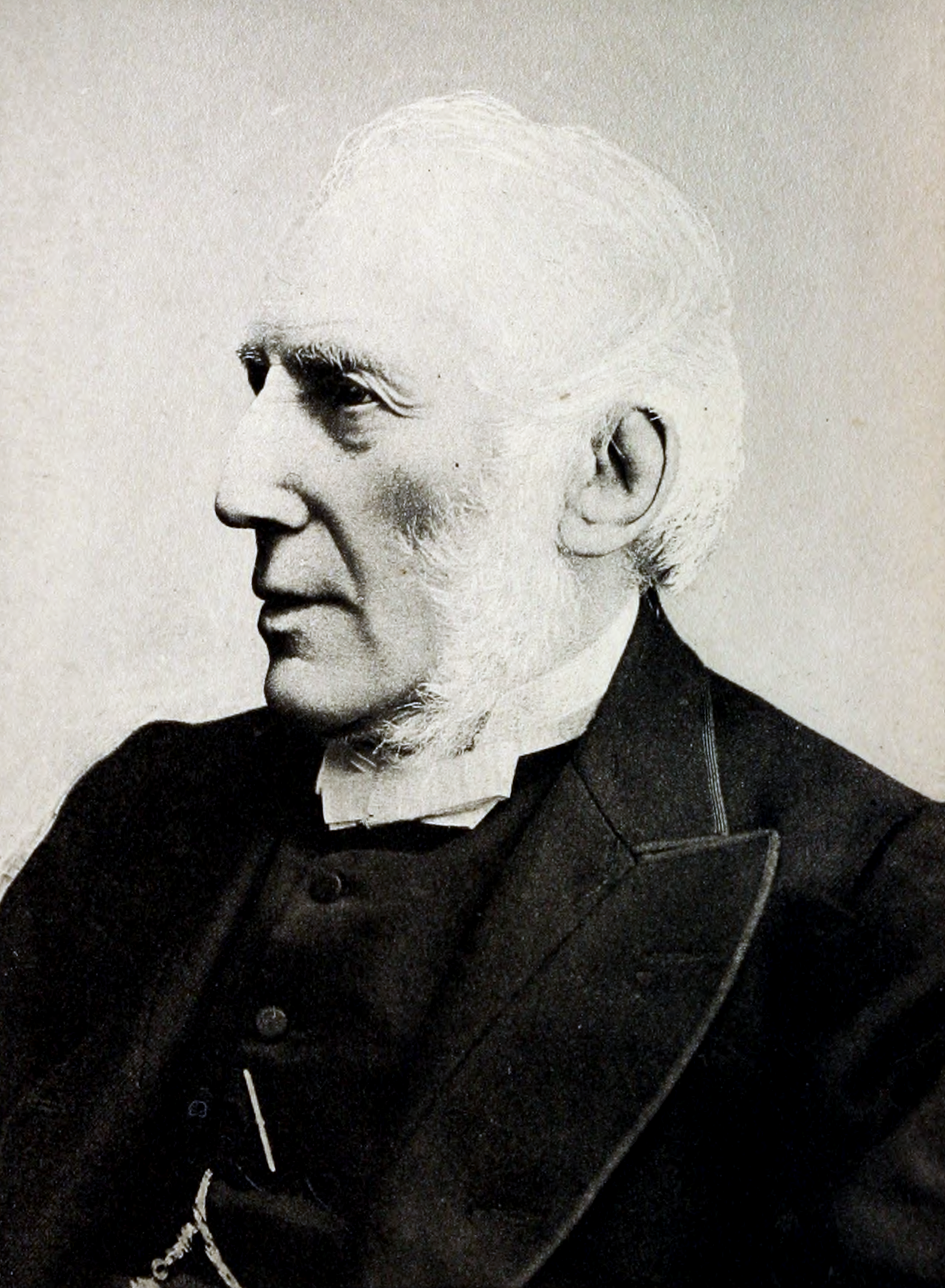
David Brown from Blaikie's memoir

David Brown (17 August 1803 in Aberdeen – 3 July 1897 in Aberdeen) was a son of bookseller who was twice Provost of the city. He was a Free Church of Scotland minister who served as Moderator of the General Assembly 1885/86. He was co-author of the Jamieson-Fausset-Brown Commentary on the whole Bible.

== Life ==
He was born in Aberdeen in 1803 the fourth son of Alexander Brown, a bookseller, and twice Lord Provost of Aberdeen, and his wife, Catharine Chalmers. He was educated at Aberdeen Grammar School. He studied divinity at Aberdeen University graduating in 1821. He was licensed to preach in 1826 then went to London for two years to work with Edward Irving.

He returned to Scotland in 1829 to assist in the ministry at Dumbarton. Emerging from a period of doubt which accompanied his studies, he became a probationer in the Church of Scotland and assistant to the celebrated Edward Irving in London, 1830–32. In 1835 he became minister of Ord, Banffshire in the Presbytery of Fordyce, Aberdeenshire.

In the Disruption of 1843 he left the Church of Scotland and became minister of Free St. James, Glasgow, and professor of theology at Free Church College of the University of Aberdeen. He was co-author of the Jamieson-Fausset-Brown Commentary (1871) with Robert Jamieson, St. Paul's, Glasgow and the Rev. A. R. Fausset, St. Cuthbert's, York, England. He was a director of the National Bible Society of Scotland, the Evangelical Alliance and the Alliance of the Reformed Churches.

He was succeeded as Moderator by Rev Alexander Neill Somerville.

He died at home, 104 Crown Street in Aberdeen on 3 July 1897.

== Family ==
He married Catherine (died 30 July 1879, aged 75), third daughter of William Dyce, M.D., Aberdeen, and Margaret Chalmers, on 25 February 1836 at Saint Nicholas's Church, Aberdeen, Scotland. and had issue —

- Margaret Dyce (married 1860 Sir David Stewart of Banchory, Lord Provost of Aberdeen from 1889 to 1894.)
- Alexander, I.C.S., died 1861
- David Dyce, M.D., London, born 30 August 1840
- Catherine Hannah
- Jane Charlotte (married James Fyfe, merchant, Manila)
- Meredith Jemima, Head of Shaftesbury Institute, London, died 8 November 1908.

His younger brother was Charles John Brown.

== Works ==
- Christ's Second Coming: Will it be Premillennial? Edinburgh, 1846.
- Watchman, what of the Sight? (Edinburgh, 1855)
- To Whom shall We Go? (Aberdeen, 1857)
- On United and Universal Prayers (Edinburgh, 1860)
- Commentary on the Epistle to the Romans (Glasgow, 1860)
- The Restoration of the Jews: the History, Principles, and Bearings of the Question (Edinburgh, 1861)
- Crushed Hopes crowned in Death (London, 1861) in memory of his son, Alexander Brown, (d. 1860) London, 1861.
- The Union Question (Edinburgh, 1867)
- A Commentary on the Old and New Testaments [with Robert Jamieson, D.D., and Andrew Robert Fausset, D.D.], vols. v. and vi. (Glasgow, 1868–70)
- Life of the late John Duncan (1796–1870), LLD. (Edinburgh, 1872)
- The Apocalypse : Its Structure and Primary Predictions (London, 1891).
- Gospels, Acts of the Apostles, and Epistle to the Romans in R. Jamieson and A. R. Fausset Commentary, Critical, Experimental, and Practical, on the Old and New Testaments 6 vols. Glasgow, 1864–70.
- Commentary on the Epistles to the Corinthians in Philip Schaff Popular Commentary on the New Testament, 1882.
- Epistle to the Romans Dods and Whyte's Handbooks for Bible Classes, Edinburgh, 1883.

== Bibliography ==
- In Memoriam, 1897
- Guthrie's Chalmers and Trail Ancestry, 25, 85, 144
- Boase's English Biography, iv., 510
- Who was Who? 93.

== See also ==
- "Author info: David Brown - Christian Classics Ethereal Library". www.ccel.org.
- Works by or about David Brown at the Internet Archive
