= John Somerville (minister) =

19th-century Church of Scotland minister

John Somerville (1774–1837) was an early 19th century Scottish minister of the Church of Scotland who also had sporting links to curling. He invented the safety catch on guns in 1824.

== Life ==
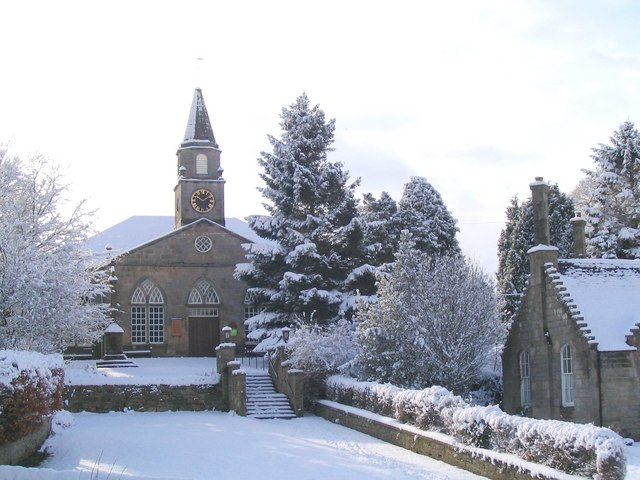
Currie Kirk

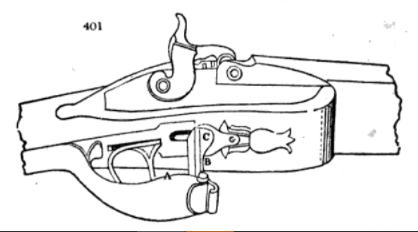
Diagram of Rev Dr Somerville's safety catch

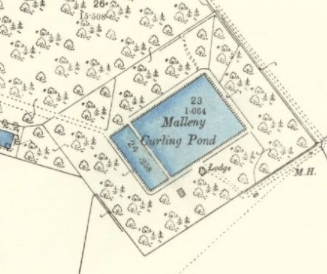
Malleny Curling Pond near Balerno

Born on the Dalmeny estate (west of Edinburgh) in 1774, Somerville was an agricultural worker in the employ of Neil Primrose, the Earl of Rosebery. Between 1785 and 1788 he injured his spine, rendering him incapable of hard farm labour. However (probably under the patronage of Primrose for reason either of guilt or generosity) his fees were paid to attend the University of Edinburgh.

In 1801 he began teaching Classics at George Heriot's School in central Edinburgh and became "House Governor" in 1805 with a reputation for "a happy mixture of severity and gentleness" and was a popular master.

Somerville was licensed to preach as a minister of the Church of Scotland by the Presbytery of Linlithgow in 1809 and was ordained as minister of Currie Parish Church in 1815 following the death of Rev James Dick. The University of Edinburgh awarded him an MA in 1816. The University of St Andrews awarded him an honorary doctorate in Divinity (DD) in 1833.

In August 1822 he was the minister who served at the laying of the foundation stone of the National Monument, Edinburgh a massive public ceremony headed by King George IV.

He died on 7 June 1837. He was unmarried and had no children.

== Inventions ==
In 1824, following the loss of a friend in a hunting accident, he invented and patented one of the world's first safety catches for use on flintlock weapons. The principle was readily applicable to all firing mechanisms. Critically this required simultaneous pressure at two points to avoid accidentally placing the gun in an unsafe condition. The invention self-evidently has saved thousands of lives.

A keen curler, he invented/devised: the iron tee, the justice, the counter, the toe-see and crampits. Curling saw a surge in interest from 1815, coinciding with Somerville's arrival in Currie. Currie had a pre-existing pond but Somerville made his own custom-made pond and to a large degree re-invented the sport. It may have suited his disability.

He was founder and President of the Currie Curling Club in 1830. In relation to safety in curling (which had suffered several deaths of persons falling through ice into water) he advocated purpose-built curling ponds which incorporated shallow ponds (around 200 to 300mm) atop a paved surface. He created a curling pond near Johnsburn House in Balerno and gifted this to the village (later known as Malleny Curling Pond). This not only had a separate "play zone" but also had a formal area around to permit organised spectation.

== Recognition ==
"Somerville Road" in Balerno (just west of Currie) is named after him.

== Publications ==
- On the Methods of Preventing the Accidental Discharge of Weapons (1825)
- Sermon on Cruelty to Animals (1827)
- Essay on the Safety Gun (1828)
- The Duty of Relieving Strangers in Distress (1834)
- Essay on the Construction, Advantages, and Mode of Using Dr Somerville's Patent Safety Gun (1835)
