= Thomas Brown (minister of St John's, Glasgow) =

Scottish minister

The Reverend Thomas Brown
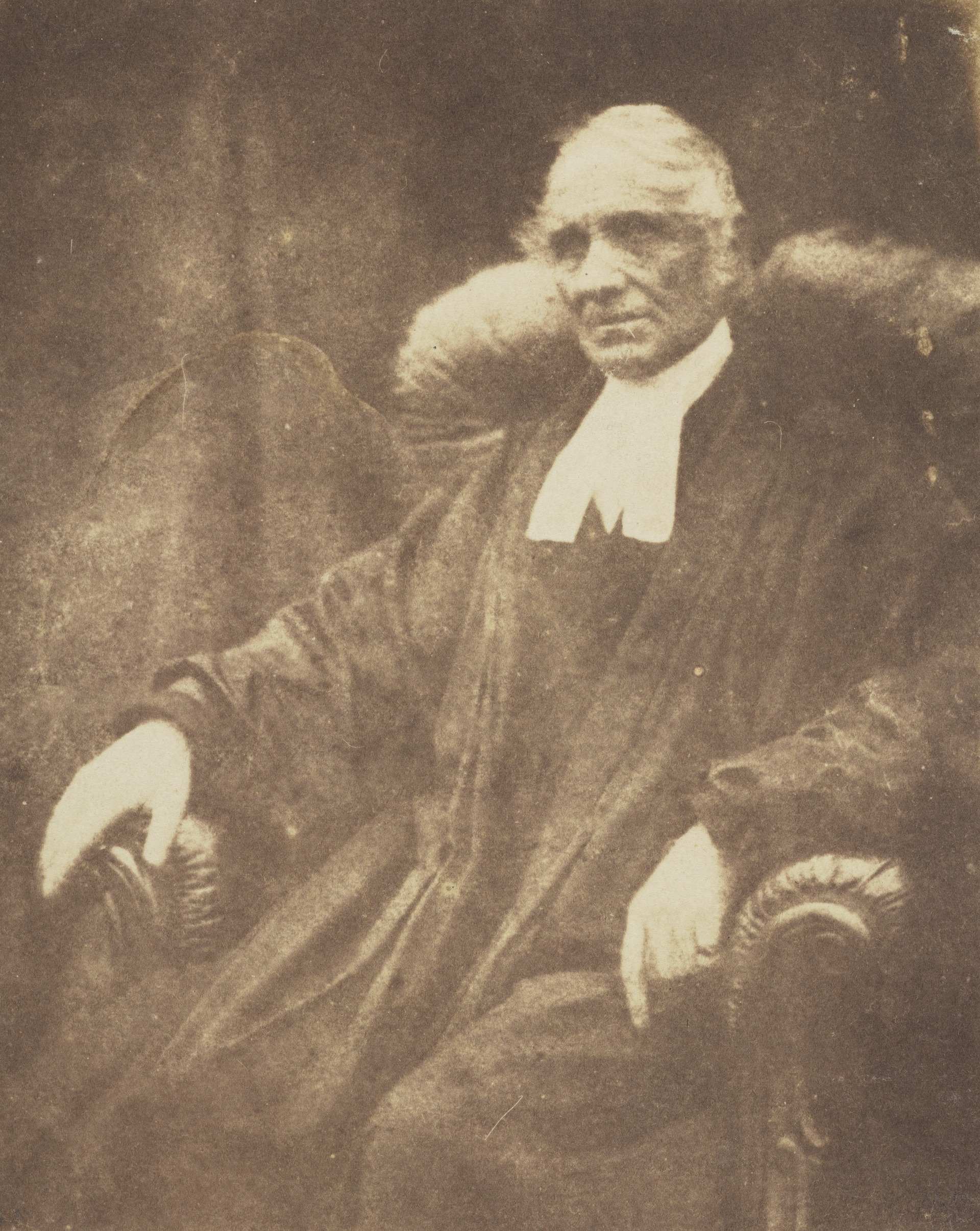
- Thomas Brown by Hill & Adamson

Personal details
- Born: 9 August 1776 Closeburn, Dumfriesshire, Scotland
- Died: 23 January 1847 (aged 70)

Minister of Tongland
- In office 26 March 1807 – 11 May 1826

Minister of St John's Parish Church, Glasgow
- In office 11 May 1826 – 19 May 1843

Minister of St John's Free Church, Glasgow
- In office 1843 – 4 November 1846

Moderator of the Free Church General Assembly
- In office 17 October 1843 – May 1844

Thomas Brown (9 August 1776 – 23 January 1847) was a Scottish Presbyterian minister who served in St John's church in Glasgow. After many years in the Church of Scotland ministry he walked out during the schism known as The Disruption and joined the Free Church of Scotland. He was elected the second-ever moderator of the Free Church in October 1843.

== Life ==
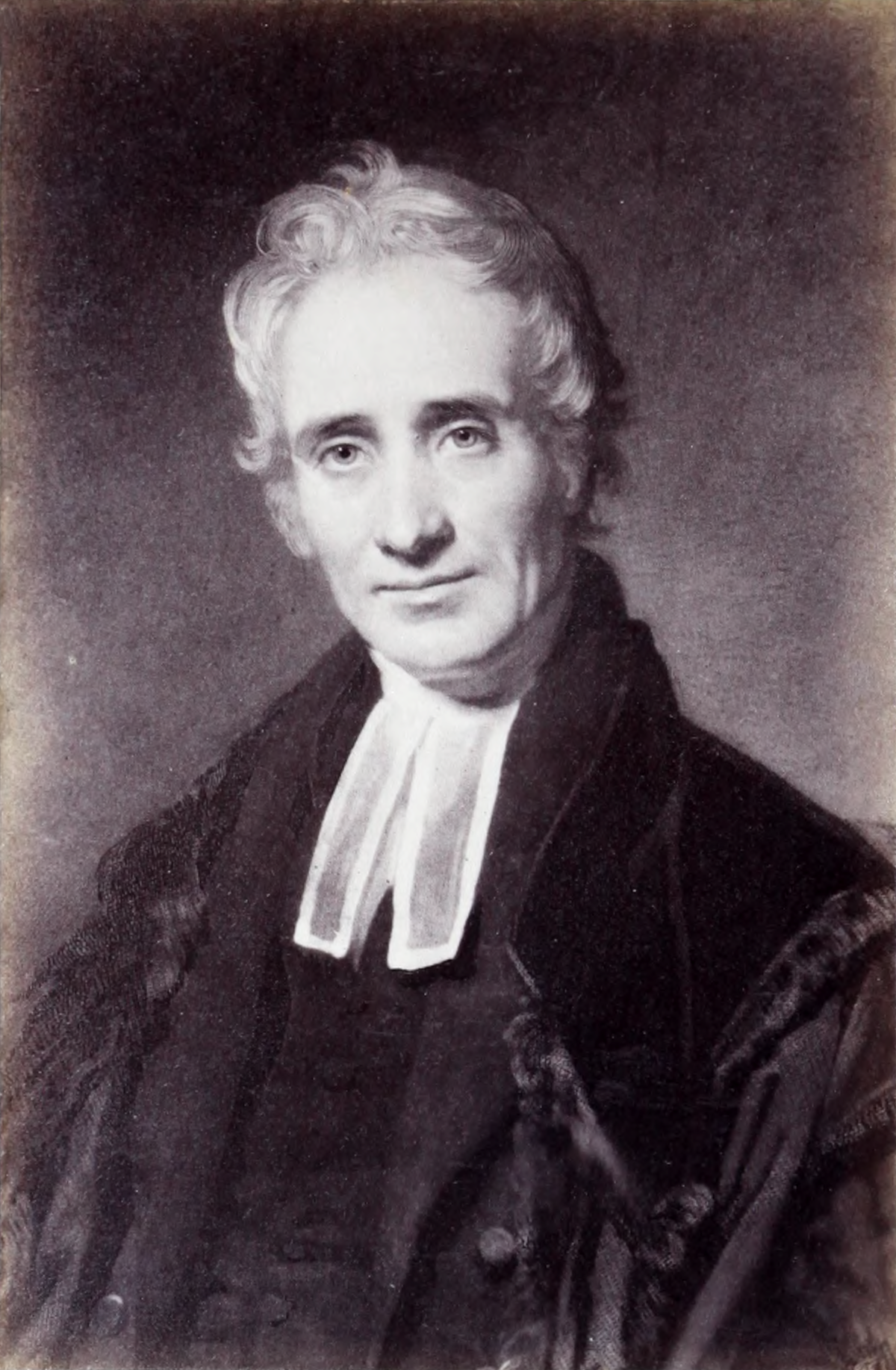
Thomas Brown by John Graham-Gilbert

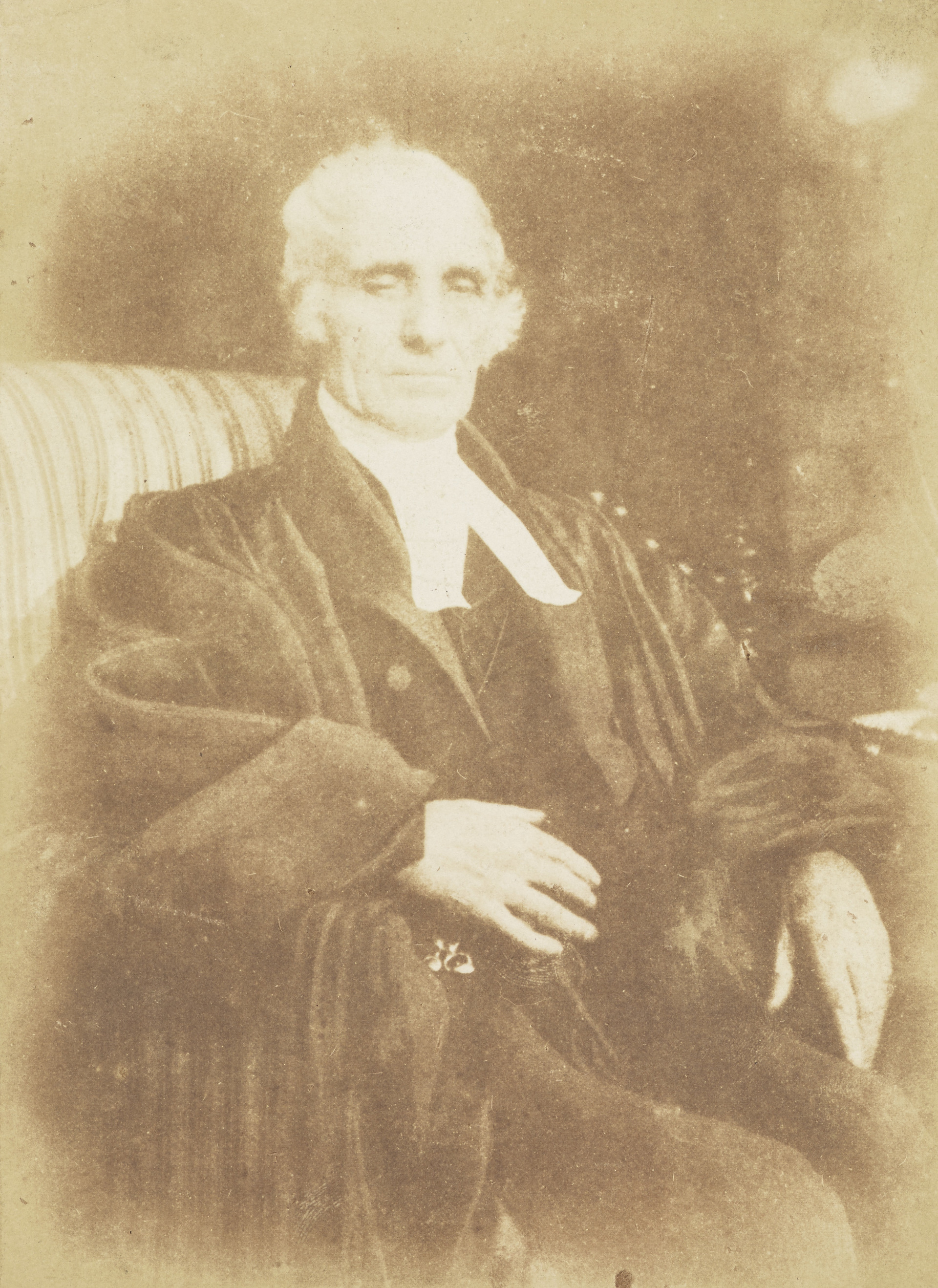
Thomas Brown by Hill & Adamson

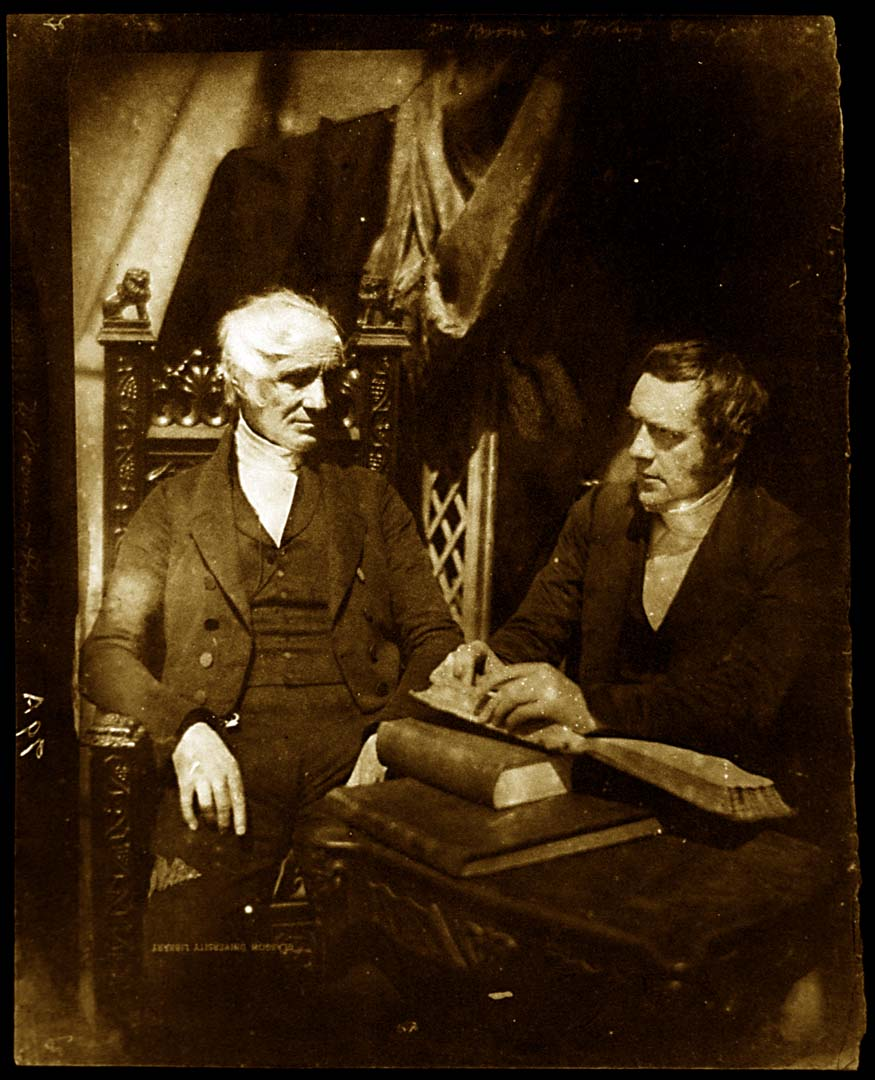
Dr Thomas Brown and Rev Dr John Forbes

Thomas Brown, was a minister of St. John's, Glasgow and the 2nd moderator of the Free Church. He was born in the parish of Closeburn, Dumfriesshire, on the 9 August 1776.

He received the first part of his education at Wallace-Hall, in the Parish of Closeburn, under the teacher Alex. Mundell; and was for some time engaged in the tuition of the younger boys of that seminary, along with Dr. Robert Mundell, the son of Mr. Mundell. He then entered as tutor into the family of Major Hoggan of Waterside, Dumfries-shire; and, while acting in that capacity, prosecuted his studies in the University of Glasgow during two winter-sessions. The rest of his University education he received at Edinburgh. During a small portion of the time of his attendance at the Divinity Hall, he acted as Usher in an academy at Inveresk, after which he entered as tutor into the family of Dr. Hunter, Professor of Divinity, and Minister of the Tron Church, Edinburgh, where he continued for five or six years.

Mr. Brown passed his trials for licence before the Presbytery of Edinburgh, and was licensed to preach the gospel on the 29 of August, 1804. He received the presentation to the Parish of Tongland, near Kirkcudbright, in September 1806, and was ordained Minister of that Parish on 26 March 1807.

During his incumbency at Tongland, he was offered four appointments to other parishes or congregations. His attachment to his flock there was so strong as to induce him to decline them all; until a vacancy having occurred in the parish of St. John's, Glasgow, he was convinced that it was his duty to accept. He was accordingly admitted minister of that church and parish in the beginning of the summer of 1826, and continued till his death, the pastor of St. John's congregation.

The most remarkable occurrence in his life during the last of the periods to which we have now referred, was the resignation of his benefice as a minister of the Establishment - along with the other ministers who, with the flocks adhering to them, constituțed the Free Church of Scotland. On the question, the agitation of which ultimately led to the Disruption, he was single-minded. He served as moderator of the Free Church General Assembly in October 1843.

Dr. Brown was married on the 9 November 1808, to Miss Eliza Duncan, by whom he had one daughter and a son, the last of whom died in infancy. His daughter married the Alexander Niven, minister of Balfron, and has a family of three sons and a daughter. He died on the 23 January 1847.

== Family ==
He married 9 November 1808, Eliza (born 1782, died 27 May 1852), daughter of John Duncan, minister of Peter Street Presbyterian Church, Golden Square, London, and had issue —

- Alexander, born 1809, died young
- Eliza, born 1 February 1810 (married Alexander Niven, D.D., minister of Balfron).

== Publications ==
- The Privileges of those to whom are committed the Oracles of God, a sermon (Edinburgh, 1836)
- Sermons [with Memoir by Patrick Macfarlan, D.D.]
