= List of listed buildings in Edinburgh/3 =

This is a list of listed buildings in Edinburgh, Scotland.

== List ==
Name	Location	Date Listed	Grid Ref. (Note: Sometimes known as OSGB36, the grid reference (where provided) is based on the British national grid reference system used by the Ordnance Survey. • "Guide to National Grid". Ordnance Survey. • "Get-a-map". Ordnance Survey.)	Geo-coordinates	Notes	LB Number (Note: Historic Environment Scotland assign a unique alphanumeric identifier to each designated site in Scotland, for listed buildings this always begins with "LB", for example "LB12345".)	Image
22 Minto Street, Including Boundary Walls And Pier				55°56′05″N 3°10′28″W	Category B	29352	Upload Photo
24-30A (Inclusive Nos) Minto Street Including Boundary Walls				55°56′03″N 3°10′27″W	Category B	29354	Upload Photo
45 And 46 Minto Street, Including Boundary Walls, Gatepiers And Pedestrian Gates				55°56′11″N 3°10′38″W	Category B	29360	Upload another image
1-18A (Inclusive Nos) Moray Place, And 10 Doune Terrace, Including Railings And Lamps, With 1-7 (Inclusive Nos) Gloucester Square, And 5-10A (Inclusive Nos) Gloucester Lane				55°57′19″N 3°12′26″W	Category A	29368	Upload another image
37-43 (Inclusive Nos) Moray Place, Including Railings And Lamps				55°57′14″N 3°12′29″W	Category A	29370	Upload another image
44-50A (Inclusive Nos) Moray Place, Including Railings And Lamps, With 6 And 7 Wemyss Place Mews				55°57′14″N 3°12′27″W	Category A	29371	Upload Photo
91-107 (Odd Nos) Morrison Street				55°56′45″N 3°12′36″W	Category B	29374	Upload Photo
10-32 (Even Nos) Morrison Street				55°56′45″N 3°12′22″W	Category C(S)	29376	Upload Photo
252-264 (Even Nos) Morrison Street, Including Railings				55°56′47″N 3°12′56″W	Category C(S)	29378	Upload Photo
1-15 (Odd Nos) And 2-16 (Even Nos) Mayville Gardens With 10 And 11 Laverockbank Road				55°58′41″N 3°12′03″W	Category B	29315	Upload another image
1-41 (Odd Numbers) Melville Street, 1-6 (Inclusive) Melville Place, Including Railings And Arched Lamp Holders				55°57′04″N 3°12′41″W	Category A	29324	Upload another image
47-61 (Odd Numbers) Melville Street, 33 Manor Place, Including Railings And Arched Lamp Holders				55°56′56″N 3°12′53″W	Category A	29325	Upload another image
28-40(Even Numbers) Melville Street, 32 Stafford Street Including Railings And Arched Lamp Holders				55°57′00″N 3°12′46″W	Category A	29327	Upload another image
11 And 12 Minto Street, Including Boundary Walls, Gatepiers, Carriage And Pedestrian Gates				55°56′10″N 3°10′34″W	Category C(S)	29344	Upload Photo
60 Newhaven Main Street				55°58′50″N 3°11′50″W	Category C(S)	29280	Upload Photo
2 And 3 Lamb's Court				55°58′50″N 3°11′44″W	Category C(S)	29282	Upload Photo
22 Newhaven Main Street				55°58′50″N 3°11′38″W	Category C(S)	29283	Upload Photo
1 And 2 Great Michael Close				55°58′49″N 3°11′38″W	Category C(S)	29284	Upload Photo
10 And 12 Newhaven Main Street				55°58′49″N 3°11′36″W	Category B	29285	Upload Photo
272-278 (Even Nos) Morrison Street And 11-14 (Inclusive Nos) West Maitland Street				55°56′47″N 3°12′58″W	Category B	29291	Upload Photo
35-47 (Odd Numbers) Manor Place, Including Railings				55°56′57″N 3°12′56″W	Category A	29298	Upload another image
47A-61 (Odd Numbers) Manor Place, 11A Rothesay Place				55°57′02″N 3°13′03″W	Category B	29299	Upload Photo
4-24 (Even Numbers) Manor Place Including Railings				55°56′52″N 3°12′52″W	Category B	29300	Upload Photo
31-37 (Odd Nos) Marshall Street And 23 Nicolson Square				55°56′45″N 3°11′11″W	Category B	29304	Upload Photo
Mary's Place, 7-12				55°57′33″N 3°12′51″W	Category B	29308	Upload Photo
5-10 (Inclusive Nos) West Mayfield, Including Boundary Walls				55°56′01″N 3°10′33″W	Category B	29311	Upload Photo
1-19 (Odd Nos) Mayfield Gardens, 1 East Mayfield And 1 Peel Terrace, Including Boundary Walls				55°56′00″N 3°10′24″W	Category B	29313	Upload Photo
27-35 (Odd Nos) Leith Street				55°57′15″N 3°11′16″W	Category B	29252	Upload Photo
Lennox Street 3-15				55°57′19″N 3°12′49″W	Category B	29254	Upload Photo
Lennox Street 17-23				55°57′21″N 3°12′52″W	Category B	29255	Upload Photo
Lennox Street 2-22				55°57′20″N 3°12′47″W	Category B	29256	Upload Photo
12-21 (Inclusive Nos) Leopold Place And 1-3A (Odd Nos) Windsor Street Including Railings				55°57′29″N 3°10′53″W	Category A	29258	Upload Photo
1-41 (Odd Nos) London Street, Including Railings And Lamps				55°57′31″N 3°11′35″W	Category A	29260	Upload Photo
2-36 (Even Nos) London Street, Including Railings And Lamps				55°57′33″N 3°11′32″W	Category A	29261	Upload Photo
42-54 (Inclusive Nos) London Street, Including Railings				55°57′33″N 3°11′28″W	Category A	29262	Upload Photo
18 East London Street, Gayfield House Including Boundary Walls And Gatepiers				55°57′37″N 3°11′15″W	Category A	29263	Upload Photo
95-103 (Odd Nos) Lothian Road				55°56′47″N 3°12′19″W	Category C(S)	29268	Upload Photo
Lutton Place 1-19 And 49 South Clerk Street				55°56′25″N 3°10′46″W	Category B	29273	Upload another image
3-22 (Inclusive Numbers) Lynedoch Place, Including Railings And Arched Lampholders				55°57′06″N 3°12′47″W	Category A	29275	Upload another image
1-10 (Inclusive Nos) Magdala Crescent And 45 Coates Gardens, Including Boundary Walls				55°56′48″N 3°13′23″W	Category B	29276	Upload Photo
11-24 (Inclusive Nos) Magdala Crescent, 1A Douglas Crescent, 31 Eglinton Crescent And 10-12 (Even Nos) Magdala Mews, Including Railings And Boundary Wall				55°56′52″N 3°13′24″W	Category B	29277	Upload Photo
1-7 (Inclusive Nos) Kew Terrace, Including Boundary Walls				55°56′43″N 3°13′50″W	Category C(S)	29200	Upload Photo
Lanark Road 491 Torduff, Now Lorimer House, Juniper Green				55°54′17″N 3°16′46″W	Category C(S)	29203	Upload Photo
Lanark Road, 500 Castlebank, Juniper Green				55°54′18″N 3°16′57″W	Category C(S)	29207	Upload Photo
1-9 (Inclusive Nos) Lansdowne Crescent, Including Railings				55°56′52″N 3°13′02″W	Category B	29211	Upload Photo
12-21 (Inclusive Nos) Lansdowne Crescent Including Railings				55°56′49″N 3°13′09″W	Category B	29212	Upload Photo
37 Lauriston Place And 1 Archibald Place, Including Boundary Wall And Railings				55°56′41″N 3°11′45″W	Category B	29216	Upload Photo
8 Lauriston Place, Including Boundary Wall, Gate And Railings				55°56′42″N 3°11′44″W	Category B	29217	Upload another image
1 And 2 Laverockbank Road, With Boundary Wall, Gates And Railings				55°58′37″N 3°12′02″W	Category A	29220	Upload Photo
3 And 4 Laverockbank Road, With Boundary Wall				55°58′38″N 3°12′02″W	Category B	29221	Upload Photo
8 And 9 Laverockbank Road, With Boundary Wall				55°58′39″N 3°12′02″W	Category B	29223	Upload Photo
17 Laverockbank Road, Starbank House, With Fountain, Boundary Walls, Gatepiers, Railings, Gates And Gateposts				55°58′45″N 3°12′03″W	Category B	29224	Upload another image
453-463 Lawnmarket, Including Wardrop's Court And 2 Lady Stair's Close				55°56′58″N 3°11′36″W	Category B	29229	Upload another image
513-521 (Odd Nos) Lawnmarket, Milne's Court, Including Edward Salveson Hall And Philip Henman Hall				55°56′57″N 3°11′40″W	Category A	29237	Upload another image See more images
302-310 (Even Nos) Lawnmarket, Including Buchanan's Close And Brodie's Close				55°56′57″N 3°11′35″W	Category A	29239	Upload Photo
1-3A (Inclusive Numbers) Learmonth Terrace, Including Railings				55°57′21″N 3°13′00″W	Category B	29245	Upload Photo
9-24 (Inclusive Numbers) Learmonth Terrace, Including Railings				55°57′20″N 3°13′05″W	Category B	29247	Upload another image
9 And 10 Hunter Square And 107 And 108 South Bridge				55°56′59″N 3°11′15″W	Category B	29125	Upload another image
26-30 (Even Nos) India Street, Including Railings And Lamps				55°57′21″N 3°12′22″W	Category A	29137	Upload Photo
54-60 (Even Nos) India Street And 34-37 (Consecutive Nos) North West Circus Place, Including Railings And Lamp				55°57′25″N 3°12′25″W	Category A	29144	Upload Photo
Inverleith Gardens 9-21				55°58′15″N 3°12′39″W	Category B	29145	Upload Photo
Inverleith Place 1-11				55°58′06″N 3°12′25″W	Category B	29147	Upload Photo
Inverleith Place 32				55°58′03″N 3°12′39″W	Category B	29152	Upload Photo
Inverleith Row, 16 And 16A				55°57′58″N 3°12′16″W	Category B	29162	Upload Photo
Inverleith Row, 25 And 26				55°58′03″N 3°12′21″W	Category B	29169	Upload Photo
Inverleith Row, 44 And 45				55°58′10″N 3°12′28″W	Category B	29178	Upload Photo
Inverleith Row 50, 51				55°58′12″N 3°12′29″W	Category C(S)	29180	Upload Photo
Inverleith Row, 56 And 57				55°58′13″N 3°12′31″W	Category B	29183	Upload Photo
Inverleith Terrace, 3-6				55°57′50″N 3°12′09″W	Category C(S)	29184	Upload Photo
Inverleith Terrace, 9-15				55°57′49″N 3°11′15″W	Category B	29186	Upload Photo
1-13 (Inclusive Nos) Johnston Terrace And Victoria Terrace				55°56′55″N 3°11′40″W	Category C(S)	29193	Upload Photo
Hill Place 6-11				55°56′47″N 3°11′02″W	Category B	29077	Upload Photo
1-10 (Inclusive) Hill Square And 16, 17 And 18 Hill Place Including Wall And Railings				55°56′48″N 3°11′04″W	Category B	29078	Upload Photo
2 And 4 Hill Street				55°57′12″N 3°12′07″W	Category A	29083	Upload Photo
1-7A (Inclusive Nos) Hillside Crescent And 2-2A Brunswick Street, Including Railings				55°57′29″N 3°10′51″W	Category A	29084	Upload another image
15 Hillside Crescent And 30 And 32 Hillside Street				55°57′30″N 3°10′43″W	Category B	29086	Upload Photo
Hope Park Square 1-5				55°56′31″N 3°11′11″W	Category B	29095	Upload another image
5-32 (Inclusive Nos) Howard Place, With Boundary Walls, Railings, Lamp Fittings And Gates				55°57′50″N 3°12′05″W	Category A	29103	Upload Photo
Howden Street 2-24 And 74-84 East Crosscauseway Fisher's Buildings				55°56′38″N 3°10′55″W	Category B	29105	Upload Photo
11 And 13 Howe Street, Including Railings				55°57′21″N 3°12′06″W	Category A	29109	Upload Photo
32-38 (Even Nos) Howe Street, Including Railings				55°57′23″N 3°12′10″W	Category A	29121	Upload Photo
1-19 (Inclusive Nos) Heriot Row, And 2 Dundas Street, And 1, 1A, 1B And 1C Howe Street, Including Railings And Lamps With Northumberland Street South West Lane (Nos 5, 6, 7, 8, 8B, 9, 9B, 11, 11A, 11B, 12, 18, 22, 26 And 27)				55°57′22″N 3°12′00″W	Category A	29025	Upload Photo
20-42 (Inclusive Nos) Heriot Row, And 2 Howe Street, 1-3 (Odd Nos) India Street, Including Railings And Lamps With Jamaica Street South Lane				55°57′18″N 3°12′18″W	Category A	29026	Upload Photo
97-105 (Odd Nos) High Street, 'Heave Awa' House', And 4 Paisley Close (Block To Rear)				55°57′02″N 3°11′10″W	Category B	29038	Upload another image
14 High Street, 5-11 (Odd Nos) Tweddale Court (Including Former Tweddale House And 9-11 Fountain Close)				55°57′01″N 3°11′04″W	Category B	29057	Upload Photo
52 And 54 High Street				55°57′01″N 3°11′09″W	Category B	29063	Upload Photo
1-11(Inclusive Nos) Hailes Street, Including Boundary Walls And Railings				55°56′30″N 3°12′18″W	Category B	28987	Upload Photo
73-77 (Odd Nos) Hanover Street With Railings				55°57′14″N 3°11′50″W	Category B	29000	Upload Photo
79-89 (Odd Nos) Hanover Street				55°57′15″N 3°11′50″W	Category A	29001	Upload Photo
91-99 (Odd Nos) Hanover Street With Railings				55°57′16″N 3°11′51″W	Category B	29002	Upload Photo
113-123 (Odd Nos, Including 117A) Hanover Street And 16A Queen Street With Railings				55°57′17″N 3°11′51″W	Category A	29004	Upload Photo
68-82 (Even Nos) Hanover Street, Incorporating Hobart House (No 80)				55°57′14″N 3°11′52″W	Category C(S)	29009	Upload Photo
92-102 (Even Nos) Hanover Street With Railings				55°57′16″N 3°11′53″W	Category B	29013	Upload Photo
15-29 (Inclusive Numbers) Hawthornbank Lane, Hawthorn Buildings				55°57′06″N 3°13′01″W	Category B	29020	Upload another image
Henderson Row, 2-28 And 162-168 Dundas Street And 2-4 Perth Street				55°57′38″N 3°12′07″W	Category B	29021	Upload Photo
44-86 (Even Nos) Great King Street And 52 And 54 Dundas Street, Including Railings And Lamps With 1, 12, 14 South West Cumberland Street Lane Including Walls And 2 St Vincent Street				55°57′29″N 3°12′00″W	Category A	28965	Upload Photo
2-6 (Even Nos) Great Stuart Street, Including Railings And Lamps				55°57′13″N 3°12′33″W	Category A	28968	Upload Photo
8-20 (Even Nos) Great Stuart Street, Including Railings, With 13 Randolph Lane				55°57′08″N 3°12′40″W	Category A	28969	Upload Photo
Greenbank Drive, 2-8 (Even Nos) And 11-57 (Odd Nos) The Steils And 35,37 And 39 Mid Steils				55°55′02″N 3°13′39″W	Category B	28970	Upload Photo
1-21 (Inclusive Nos) Grosvenor Crescent, Including Railings				55°56′53″N 3°13′06″W	Category B	28974	Upload Photo
2-24 (Even Nos) Grosvenor Street, Including Railings				55°56′48″N 3°13′02″W	Category B	28978	Upload Photo
7-15 (Odd Nos) Gloucester Place, Including Railings And Lamps				55°57′23″N 3°12′26″W	Category A	28925	Upload Photo
4-14 (Even Nos) Gloucester Place, Including Railings And Lamps				55°57′24″N 3°12′28″W	Category A	28926	Upload Photo
37-41 (Odd Nos) Grassmarket				55°56′50″N 3°11′46″W	Category B	28935	Upload another image
4-10 (Even Nos) Grassmarket, Including Former Church And Fragment Of Flodden Wall				55°56′50″N 3°11′51″W	Category B	28936	Upload another image
60-64 (Even Nos) Grassmarket				55°56′52″N 3°11′45″W	Category B	28939	Upload another image
9 And 9A South Gray Street And 11 West Mayfield, Including Boundary Walls				55°56′01″N 3°10′35″W	Category B	28949	Upload Photo
31 And 33 Upper Gray Street, Including Boundary Walls				55°56′09″N 3°10′41″W	Category B	28956	Upload Photo
30-34 (Even Nos) Upper Gray Street				55°56′09″N 3°10′43″W	Category B	28959	Upload Photo
36 And 38 Upper Gray Street				55°56′09″N 3°10′43″W	Category B	28960	Upload Photo
3-41 (Odd Nos) Great King Street And 39-43 (Odd Nos) Dundas Street, Including Railings And Lamps				55°57′28″N 3°11′52″W	Category A	28962	Upload Photo
45-89 (Odd Nos) Great King Street And 39 And 39A Howe Street And 38-50 (Even N0S) Dundas Street Including Railings And Lamps With 1A, 3, 5 And Gifford Mews, Northumberland Street North West Lane				55°57′27″N 3°12′00″W	Category A	28963	Upload Photo
3-27 (Inclusive Nos) Glencairn Crescent And 42-44 (Even Nos) Coates Gardens, Including Railings				55°56′52″N 3°13′15″W	Category B	28921	Upload Photo
93 George Street				55°57′10″N 3°12′09″W	Category B	28848	Upload Photo
95 And 95A George Street, Refuge Building				55°57′10″N 3°12′09″W	Category B	28849	Upload Photo
18 And 20 George Street				55°57′12″N 3°11′47″W	Category B	28863	Upload Photo
134-138 (Even Nos) George Street, Roxburghe Hotel, With Railings (Formerly 134-142)				55°57′06″N 3°12′21″W	Category B	28887	Upload Photo
27-30 (Inclusive Nos) George Iv Bridge And 27 Candlemaker Row				55°56′50″N 3°11′30″W	Category B	28890	Upload Photo
32 And 34 George Iv Bridge And 21 And 23 Candlemaker Row, With Retaining Wall And Railings				55°56′50″N 3°11′30″W	Category B	28891	Upload Photo
14 Gillespie Road, Roxobel, With Boundary Walls				55°54′26″N 3°15′46″W	Category C(S)	28898	Upload Photo
2-6 (Inclusive Nos) Gillespie Street, Including Boundary Walls				55°56′28″N 3°12′26″W	Category C(S)	28901	Upload Photo
8-24 (Even Nos) Gilmore Place Including Boundary Walls And Railings				55°56′30″N 3°12′22″W	Category B	28910	Upload Photo
1, 1A And 2 Glencairn Crescent And 50 Palmerston Place, Including Railings				55°56′56″N 3°13′08″W	Category B	28920	Upload another image
4-10 (Even Nos) Forth Street And Hart Street Lane With Boundary Walls				55°57′28″N 3°11′18″W	Category B	28774	Upload Photo
9-15 (Odd Nos) Frederick Street				55°57′08″N 3°11′58″W	Category B	28780	Upload another image
8, 8B And 9 Gayfield Square Including Railings				55°57′34″N 3°11′12″W	Category B	28804	Upload Photo
24, 25 And 26 Gayfield Square Including Railings				55°57′34″N 3°11′07″W	Category A	28807	Upload Photo
George Square 18				55°56′38″N 3°11′26″W	Category A	28810	Upload another image
George Square 21				55°56′37″N 3°11′26″W	Category A	28813	Upload another image
George Square 28				55°56′34″N 3°11′25″W	Category A	28821	Upload Photo
29 And 31 George Street And 69 Hanover Street, Clydesdale Bank With Railings				55°57′14″N 3°11′49″W	Category A	28831	Upload Photo
33 And 35 George Street And 60-66 (Even Nos) Hanover Street With Railings				55°57′13″N 3°11′51″W	Category B	28832	Upload Photo
39 And 41 George Street				55°57′13″N 3°11′54″W	Category B	28834	Upload Photo
57-61 (Odd Nos) George Street And 39-41A South West Thistle Street Lane				55°57′13″N 3°11′58″W	Category B	28840	Upload Photo
65 George Street, Phillips, And 43-45 South West Thistle Street Lane				55°57′12″N 3°12′00″W	Category B	28842	Upload another image
1, 2 And 3 Eglinton Crescent And 52 Palmerston Place, Including Railings				55°56′58″N 3°13′09″W	Category B	28728	Upload Photo
26-30 (Inclusive Nos) Eglinton Crescent, Including Railings				55°56′52″N 3°13′22″W	Category B	28730	Upload Photo
2 Ellersly Road, Innerwick, Including Coach House				55°56′51″N 3°14′49″W	Category B	28733	Upload Photo
Eton Terrace 1-13				55°57′15″N 3°12′51″W	Category A	28737	Upload Photo
Eyre Crescent 1-29 And 21-23 Eyre Place				55°57′41″N 3°12′01″W	Category C(S)	28739	Upload Photo
200 And 202 Ferry Road Including Piers And Boundary Walls				55°58′26″N 3°11′30″W	Category B	28748	Upload Photo
1-12 (Inclusive Nos) Fettes Row, And 99-103 (Odd Nos) Dundas Street, Including Railings And Lamps With 13 North East Cumberland Street Lane Including Wall				55°57′33″N 3°11′58″W	Category B	28754	Upload Photo
1-11 (Odd Nos) Forres Street, Including Railings				55°57′14″N 3°12′27″W	Category A	28768	Upload another image
41A-45 (Odd Nos) Broughton Street And 1 Forth Street				55°57′28″N 3°11′11″W	Category A	28772	Upload Photo
47-53 (Odd Nos) Broughton Street And 2 Forth Street				55°57′28″N 3°11′18″W	Category B	28773	Upload Photo
2-22 (Inclusive Nos) Drummond Street And 2-6 (Even Nos) Nicolson Street				55°56′50″N 3°11′09″W	Category B	28671	Upload Photo
1-14 (Inclusive Numbers) Drumsheugh Gardens, 29 Walker Street, Including Railings				55°57′03″N 3°12′49″W	Category B	28674	Upload Photo
13 And 15 Dublin Street, Including Railings				55°57′23″N 3°11′34″W	Category B	28680	Upload Photo
Duddingston Road West, Craigmillar Brewery				55°56′04″N 3°08′34″W	Category B	28699	Upload Photo
1-9 (Inclusive Nos) Duncan Street And 39 Minto Street, Including Boundary Walls And Railings				55°56′08″N 3°10′37″W	Category B	28700	Upload another image

== Key ==
The scheme for classifying buildings in Scotland is:

- Category A: "buildings of national or international importance, either architectural or historic; or fine, little-altered examples of some particular period, style or building type."
- Category B: "buildings of regional or more than local importance; or major examples of some particular period, style or building type, which may have been altered."
- Category C: "buildings of local importance; lesser examples of any period, style, or building type, as originally constructed or moderately altered; and simple traditional buildings which group well with other listed buildings."

In March 2016 there were 47,288 listed buildings in Scotland. Of these, 8% were Category A, and 50% were Category B, with the remaining 42% being Category C.

== See also ==
- List of listed buildings in Edinburgh
