= List of listed buildings in Edinburgh/2 =

Listed heritage buildings in Edinburgh, Scotland

This is a list of listed buildings in Edinburgh, Scotland.

== List ==
Name	Location	Date Listed	Grid Ref. (Note: Sometimes known as OSGB36, the grid reference (where provided) is based on the British national grid reference system used by the Ordnance Survey. • "Guide to National Grid". Ordnance Survey. • "Get-a-map". Ordnance Survey.)	Geo-coordinates	Notes	LB Number (Note: Historic Environment Scotland assign a unique alphanumeric identifier to each designated site in Scotland, for listed buildings this always begins with "LB", for example "LB12345".)	Image
Dean Bank Terrace 2, 3, 4, Saxe-Coburg Terrace				55°57′36″N 3°12′26″W	Category B	30097	Upload Photo
71 George Street And 36 And 38 Frederick Street				55°57′12″N 3°12′03″W	Category A	30102	Upload Photo
89 George Street				55°57′10″N 3°12′08″W	Category B	30103	Upload Photo
179 High Street And 73 Cockburn Street				55°57′01″N 3°11′17″W	Category B	30117	Upload another image
Hope Park Crescent 6-11				55°56′27″N 3°10′57″W	Category B	30118	Upload another image
Hope Park Terrace 1-5				55°56′27″N 3°10′57″W	Category B	30119	Upload another image
118 And 120 Lauriston Place, Including Boundary Wall And Railings				55°56′41″N 3°12′04″W	Category B	30126	Upload Photo
63-67 (Odd Nos) York Place, Including Railings				55°57′23″N 3°11′17″W	Category A	29973	Upload Photo
2-4A (Even Nos) York Place, And 3-9 (Odd Nos) Dublin Street				55°57′22″N 3°11′34″W	Category A	29975	Upload Photo
22 York Place, Including Railing And Lamp				55°57′23″N 3°11′28″W	Category A	29984	Upload Photo
36 York Place, Including Railings				55°57′24″N 3°11′24″W	Category A	29991	Upload Photo
40, 42 York Place, Including Railings And Boundary Wall				55°57′24″N 3°11′23″W	Category A	29993	Upload Photo
24 York Road, Gothic House, With Boundary Wall And Gatepiers				55°58′41″N 3°12′10″W	Category A	29998	Upload Photo
7 Young Street				55°57′11″N 3°12′18″W	Category A	30000	Upload Photo
10 And 12 Young Street, Sovereign House				55°57′10″N 3°12′18″W	Category C(S)	30006	Upload Photo
14 Young Street				55°57′10″N 3°12′21″W	Category A	30007	Upload Photo
Princes Street, General Register House Circular Record Hall ('Back Dome')				55°57′15″N 3°11′22″W	Category B	30025	Upload another image
Fettes College South Gates And Railings To Carrington Road) And On Fettes Avenue As Far As East Lodge. East Lodge And Gates Fettes Avenue. West Lodge And Gates. Glencorse House. Moredun House				55°57′52″N 3°13′22″W	Category B	30044	Upload Photo
6 East Suffolk Road (Lodge) And 1-13 (Inclusive Numbers) And 20-22 (Inclusive Numbers) East Suffolk Park, Gatepiers, Boundary Walls And Railings				55°55′47″N 3°10′05″W	Category B	30050	Upload Photo
110 And 112 West Bow (Including Edmonstone's Close)				55°56′53″N 3°11′39″W	Category B	29910	Upload Photo
Whitehill Street 24-30 Newcraighall				55°56′08″N 3°05′21″W	Category C(S)	29914	Upload Photo
44 Whitehouse Road, Almond Bank House, Including Boundary Wall				55°58′29″N 3°18′09″W	Category C(S)	29928	Upload Photo
33-51 (Odd Numbers) William Street				55°56′55″N 3°12′51″W	Category B	29930	Upload Photo
6-26 (Even Numbers) William Street				55°56′58″N 3°12′44″W	Category B	29931	Upload Photo
28, 30, 32, 24, 36, 38 William Street				55°56′55″N 3°12′50″W	Category B	29932	Upload Photo
5-29 (Odd Nos) Windsor Street Including Railings				55°57′29″N 3°10′55″W	Category A	29942	Upload Photo
6-26 (Even Nos) Windsor Street Including Railings				55°57′30″N 3°10′57″W	Category A	29944	Upload Photo
4-32 (Even Nos) Montgomery Street And 28-30 (Even Nos) Windsor Street Including Railings				55°57′32″N 3°10′57″W	Category B	29945	Upload Photo
47 And 49 Woodhall Road With Boundary Wall				55°54′14″N 3°15′42″W	Category C(S)	29951	Upload Photo
51 And 53 Woodhall Road With Boundary Wall And Railings				55°54′14″N 3°15′44″W	Category C(S)	29952	Upload Photo
27 York Place, Including Railings				55°57′22″N 3°11′25″W	Category A	29964	Upload Photo
29-31 (Odd Nos) York Place, Including Railings				55°57′22″N 3°11′24″W	Category A	29965	Upload Photo
47-49 (Odd Nos) York Place, Including Railings				55°57′22″N 3°11′21″W	Category A	29969	Upload Photo
8-20 (Consecutive Nos) Wardie Square				55°58′46″N 3°13′01″W	Category C(S)	29884	Upload Photo
119-144 (Consecutive Nos) Lower Granton Road				55°58′47″N 3°13′08″W	Category C(S)	29888	Upload Photo
1-6 (Consecutive Nos) Wardie Square Including Boundary Wall				55°58′47″N 3°13′00″W	Category C(S)	29889	Upload Photo
24-30 (Consecutive Nos) Wardie Square				55°58′47″N 3°13′01″W	Category C(S)	29890	Upload Photo
5-33 (Inclusive Nos) Warriston Crescent With Railings				55°57′50″N 3°12′00″W	Category A	29894	Upload Photo
1-21 (Odd Nos) Waterloo Place And 1-3 Leith Street, 16 Calton Road And 7 Regent Arch Place, Including Waterloo Buffet				55°57′13″N 3°11′17″W	Category A	29895	Upload Photo
23-27 (Odd Nos) Waterloo Place				55°57′14″N 3°11′12″W	Category A	29896	Upload Photo
1-11 (Inclusive Nos) Wemyss Place, Including Railings				55°57′14″N 3°12′21″W	Category A	29901	Upload Photo
95-99 (Odd Nos) West Bow				55°56′54″N 3°11′41″W	Category A	29905	Upload Photo
4-16B (Even Numbers) Stafford Street And 2, 4 William Street				55°56′58″N 3°12′42″W	Category B	29830	Upload Photo
Thistle Street, 1 And 2 Thistle Court With Lamp Brackets, Boundary Walls, Gates And Railings				55°57′16″N 3°11′43″W	Category A	29836	Upload another image
40-44 (Even Nos) Thistle Street				55°57′14″N 3°11′56″W	Category B	29842	Upload Photo
9-15A (Inclusive Nos, Except No 14) Trinity Crescent With Railings				55°58′48″N 3°12′19″W	Category C(S)	29853	Upload Photo
7 And 9 Union Street Including Railings And Boundary Wall				55°57′30″N 3°11′10″W	Category B	29863	Upload Photo
5-8 (Inclusive Nos) Upper Bow				55°56′56″N 3°11′38″W	Category C(S)	29865	Upload another image
38-46 (Even Nos) Victoria Street				55°56′55″N 3°11′40″W	Category B	29873	Upload Photo
3, 5, 7, 9 Walker Street				55°56′56″N 3°12′45″W	Category A	29878	Upload Photo
12, 14, 16 Walker Street				55°56′57″N 3°12′49″W	Category A	29882	Upload Photo
10-13 (Inclusive Nos) South Bridge And 15 Niddry Street				55°56′59″N 3°11′14″W	Category C(S)	29790	Upload Photo
19-36 (Inclusive Nos) South Bridge, 29-57 (Inclusive Nos) Niddry Street And 212 Cowgate				55°56′57″N 3°11′13″W	Category C(S)	29791	Upload Photo
37-52 (Inclusive Nos) South Bridge, 1-5 (Odd Nos) Infirmary Street And 2-14 (Even Nos) Niddry Street South				55°56′55″N 3°11′12″W	Category C(S)	29792	Upload Photo
Infirmary Street, South Bridge Resource Centre And 8 Infirmary Street, Including Boundary Walls And Gatepiers				55°56′53″N 3°11′08″W	Category B	29793	Upload Photo
85-99 (Inclusive Nos) South Bridge, 22-40 (Even Nos) Blair Street And 208 Cowgate				55°56′56″N 3°11′14″W	Category B	29797	Upload another image
1-8 (Inclusive Nos) South College And 1-11 (Odd Nos) Nicolson Street				55°56′49″N 3°11′10″W	Category B	29798	Upload another image
1 Spylaw Avenue, Glenlinden, And 12B Spylaw Park With Boundary Wall And Gatepiers				55°54′28″N 3°16′00″W	Category C(S)	29803	Upload Photo
45 Spylaw Bank Road, Glenlyon, With Boundary Wall, Gatepiers, Garage, Garden Terrace And Steps				55°54′32″N 3°15′47″W	Category B	29818	Upload Photo
49 Spylaw Bank Road, Almora, With Boundary Wall, Gatepiers, Motor House And Garden Terrace				55°54′32″N 3°15′49″W	Category B	29819	Upload Photo
65 Spylaw Bank Road, Balmadies, With Boundary Wall, Gatepiers, Garage And Greenhouse				55°54′33″N 3°16′07″W	Category B	29820	Upload Photo
52 Spylaw Bank Road, Sir William Fraser Homes With Pavilions, Birdbath, Garden House, Boundary Walls And Gatepiers				55°54′33″N 3°15′48″W	Category A	29821	Upload Photo
5, 7, 8, 10, 11, 12, 14, 16 And 17 Spylaw Street				55°54′27″N 3°15′28″W	Category C(S)	29822	Upload Photo
St Patrick Square 26-34				55°56′35″N 3°11′02″W	Category B	29737	Upload Photo
St Patrick Square 35-41				55°56′36″N 3°11′02″W	Category B	29738	Upload Photo
St Stephen Street 17-29 And 1-11 St Stephen Place				55°57′28″N 3°12′26″W	Category B	29744	Upload Photo
5-11 (Odd Nos) St Vincent Street, Including Railings				55°57′28″N 3°12′12″W	Category B	29749	Upload Photo
35 And 37 Salisbury Road, Including Boundary Walls				55°56′16″N 3°10′36″W	Category B	29756	Upload Photo
2 And 2A Salisbury Road, The Salisbury Centre, Including Gatepiers				55°56′18″N 3°10′28″W	Category C(S)	29758	Upload Photo
5-11 (Inclusive Nos) Rutland Square, Including Railings And Lamp Standards				55°56′55″N 3°12′31″W	Category A	29688	Upload another image
12-22 (Inclusive Nos) Rutland Square And 6 And 7 Rutland Court Lane, Including Railings And Lamp Standards				55°56′54″N 3°12′35″W	Category A	29689	Upload another image
11-25 (Odd Nos) Rutland Street, Including Railings And Lamp Standards				55°56′57″N 3°12′31″W	Category B	29693	Upload another image
1 And 2 St Andrew Square And 16-22 (Even Nos) South St Andrew Street, Former Prudential Assurance Building, With Railings				55°57′13″N 3°11′32″W	Category B	29695	Upload another image
42 St Andrew Square, Royal Bank Of Scotland				55°57′14″N 3°11′29″W	Category A	29708	Upload Photo
St Bernard's Crescent 3-35 And 52-58 Dean Street				55°57′28″N 3°12′41″W	Category A	29712	Upload another image
St. Bernard's Crescent, 16-26				55°57′26″N 3°12′47″W	Category B	29717	Upload Photo
7 And 9 North St David Street And Queen Street				55°57′19″N 3°11′40″W	Category A	29727	Upload Photo
23, 24, 25 & 26 St James Square				55°57′17″N 3°11′24″W	Category A	29728	Upload Photo
2, 3, 4, 5, 6 Rothesay Place				55°57′03″N 3°13′00″W	Category B	29663	Upload Photo
7, 8, 9, 10, 11 Rothesay Place				55°57′02″N 3°13′02″W	Category B	29664	Upload Photo
3 Rothesay Terrace, Melvin House				55°57′05″N 3°13′00″W	Category A	29668	Upload another image
2 Roxburgh Street And 36, 37 Drummond Street Including Railings				55°56′52″N 3°11′01″W	Category B	29675	Upload Photo
1-25 Royal Circus (Odd Nos), And 1-6 (Inclusive Nos) Circus Gardens, 29-33 (Odd Nos) India Street, 1-9A (Odd Nos) South East Circus Place And 40-48A(Even Nos) Howe Street, Including Railings And Lamps With 24 Jamaica Street North Lane				55°57′24″N 3°12′12″W	Category A	29677	Upload Photo
2-32 Royal Circus (Even Nos), And 1-10 North West Circus Place, 2-6 (Even Nos) North East Circus Place And 1-3A (Odd Nos) St Vincent Street, Including Railings And Lamps				55°57′27″N 3°12′13″W	Category A	29678	Upload Photo
15-23A (Inclusive Nos) Royal Crescent, And 15 Dundonald Street, Including Railings And Lamps				55°57′34″N 3°11′52″W	Category A	29680	Upload Photo
1 and 2 Royal Terrace, including Railings and Boundary Walls				55°57′24″N 3°10′40″W	Category A	29681	Upload another image
Rankeillor Street, 5-15				55°56′32″N 3°10′53″W	Category B	29604	Upload Photo
Rankeillor Street, 8-52				55°56′33″N 3°10′58″W	Category B	29605	Upload Photo
Rankeillor Street, 54 And 45-55 St Leonard's Street				55°56′35″N 3°10′48″W	Category B	29606	Upload Photo
Redhall Bank Road, 4, Inglis Bank				55°55′12″N 3°15′22″W	Category B	29616	Upload Photo
Redhall Bank Road, 8-10				55°55′10″N 3°15′23″W	Category B	29617	Upload Photo
1 Regent Terrace, including Railings and Boundary Walls				55°57′18″N 3°10′35″W	Category A	29618	Upload another image
28-48 (Even Nos) West Register Street, Formerly Royal Bank Stationary Warehouse				55°57′13″N 3°11′27″W	Category B	29620	Upload Photo
16-20 (Even Nos) Robertson's Close				55°56′54″N 3°11′10″W	Category B	29631	Upload another image
37-49 (Odd Nos) Rose Street				55°57′10″N 3°11′52″W	Category B	29632	Upload another image
95-99 (Odd Nos) Rose Street				55°57′08″N 3°12′04″W	Category B	29640	Upload Photo
101-105 (Odd Nos) Rose Street				55°57′08″N 3°12′05″W	Category B	29641	Upload Photo
196-200 (Even Nos) Rose Street And Wall To Rear				55°57′05″N 3°12′18″W	Category B	29654	Upload Photo
1-36 (Inclusive Nos) Rosebank Cottages, Including Boundary Walls				55°56′43″N 3°12′39″W	Category B	29656	Upload another image
6, 7 And 8 Rosebery Crescent, Including Railings				55°56′48″N 3°13′09″W	Category C(S)	29660	Upload Photo
Rosebery Crescent 10-14				55°56′47″N 3°13′11″W	Category B	29661	Upload Photo
23-25 (Inclusive Nos) Queen Street With Railings				55°57′17″N 3°11′57″W	Category A	29545	Upload Photo
26, 26A And 27 Queen Street (Including Stewart House) With Railings And Lamp Standards				55°57′16″N 3°11′58″W	Category A	29546	Upload Photo
28 And 29 Queen Street With Railings And Lamp Standards				55°57′16″N 3°11′59″W	Category A	29548	Upload Photo
48 Queen Street With Railings And Lamp Standards				55°57′14″N 3°12′09″W	Category A	29558	Upload Photo
66 And 67 Queen Street, With 33 And 35 Young Street Lane North, Railings And Lamp Standards				55°57′13″N 3°12′19″W	Category A	29570	Upload Photo
79, 79A And 80 Queen Street And 5 And 6 North Charlotte Street				55°57′11″N 3°12′25″W	Category A	29574	Upload Photo
23-39 (Inclusive Nos) Queensferry Street And 14 Randolph Place				55°57′03″N 3°12′34″W	Category B	29576	Upload Photo
18, 19, 20 Queensferry Street				55°57′03″N 3°12′37″W	Category B	29578	Upload Photo
Raeburn Place 1-17				55°57′32″N 3°12′37″W	Category B	29579	Upload Photo
Raeburn Place 2-14 And 2, 4, 6 St Bernard's Row				55°57′32″N 3°12′36″W	Category B	29584	Upload Photo
Raeburn Place, 16-26				55°57′33″N 3°12′39″W	Category B	29585	Upload Photo
28, 28A, 30 And 30A-D Raeburn Place, Including Boundary Walls				55°57′33″N 3°12′39″W	Category C(S)	29586	Upload Photo
Raeburn Street, 2-10				55°57′31″N 3°12′44″W	Category B	29591	Upload Photo
1-8 (Inclusive Nos) Randolph Crescent, Including Railings, With 2 And 3-9 (Odd Nos) Randolph Lane				55°57′06″N 3°12′39″W	Category A	29600	Upload another image
9-17 (inclusive Nos) Randolph Crescent, including Railings				55°57′08″N 3°12′46″W	Category A	29601	Upload another image
16-28 (Even Nos) Palmerston Place, Including Railings				55°56′52″N 3°13′00″W	Category B	29475	Upload Photo
54-62 (Even Nos) Palmerston Place, Including Railings				55°56′59″N 3°13′10″W	Category B	29478	Upload Photo
Picardy Place 2-22 (Even Nos) And 16,17 Union Place And 19, 19A Broughton Street With Mews To Broughton Street Lane				55°57′26″N 3°11′11″W	Category B	29488	Upload another image
3 Wester Close				55°58′51″N 3°11′43″W	Category C(S)	29489	Upload Photo
2A-18 West Preston Street				55°56′21″N 3°10′50″W	Category B	29500	Upload Photo
16-18 (Inclusive Nos) Princes Street				55°57′12″N 3°11′26″W	Category B	29501	Upload Photo
97, 97A And 98 Princes Street And 1 And 3 Frederick Street				55°57′07″N 3°11′58″W	Category B	29508	Upload Photo
129 Princes Street				55°57′03″N 3°12′18″W	Category B	29516	Upload Photo
4 Lothian Road, the Caledonian Hotel, including Piers, Railings and Former Screen Entrance to Station				55°56′58″N 3°12′26″W	Category A	29524	Upload another image
8 Queen Street, Royal College of Physicians, with Railings				55°57′18″N 3°11′47″W	Category A	29535	Upload another image
114 And 118 Hanover Street And 17 And 17A Queen Street With Railings				55°57′17″N 3°11′54″W	Category B	29541	Upload Photo
Nicolson Street West, 35-53				55°56′41″N 3°11′08″W	Category B	29436	Upload Photo
1 And 2 Northfield Gardens				55°56′57″N 3°08′17″W	Category B	29442	Upload another image
125 High Street/2 North Gray's Close				55°57′02″N 3°11′12″W	Category B	29443	Upload Photo
1 Northumberland Street, And 20 And 22 Nelson Street, Including Railings				55°57′27″N 3°11′47″W	Category A	29445	Upload Photo
3-17A (Odd Nos) Northumberland Street, Including Railings And Lamps				55°57′27″N 3°11′48″W	Category A	29446	Upload Photo
43-47 (Odd Nos) Northumberland Street, Including Railings And Lamps And 2 Northumberland Street North West Lane				55°57′25″N 3°12′00″W	Category A	29449	Upload Photo
51-61 (Odd Nos) Northumberland Street, Including Railings And Lamps With 8-14 (Even Nos) Northumberland Street North West Lane				55°57′24″N 3°12′04″W	Category A	29451	Upload Photo
14-26 (Even Nos) Northumberland Street, Including Railings And Lamps				55°57′25″N 3°11′52″W	Category A	29455	Upload Photo
42-68 (Even Nos) Northumberland Street, Including Railings And Lamps				55°57′23″N 3°12′04″W	Category A	29458	Upload Photo
2-6 (Inclusive Numbers) East Norton Place And 53-61 (Odd Numbers) Montrose Terrace				55°57′26″N 3°10′14″W	Category B	29460	Upload Photo
7-19 (Inclusive Numbers) East Norton Place				55°57′27″N 3°10′14″W	Category C(S)	29461	Upload Photo
3-21 (Odd Numbers) Palmerston Place Including Railings				55°56′52″N 3°12′57″W	Category B	29472	Upload Photo
1-20 Murray Cottages Including Boundary Walls				55°56′22″N 3°17′32″W	Category C(S)	29381	Upload Photo
10-14 (Even Nos) Nelson Street, Including Railings And Lamps				55°57′25″N 3°11′48″W	Category A	29390	Upload Photo
202 And 204 Newhaven Road Including Boundary Wall And Coach House To No 204				55°58′41″N 3°11′34″W	Category C(S)	29400	Upload Photo
1-3 (Inclusive Nos) East Newington Place, Including Boundary Walls				55°56′20″N 3°10′40″W	Category B	29403	Upload Photo
1-27 (Odd Nos), 35, 37 Newington Road And 1, 3 East Preston Street Including Boundary Walls				55°56′19″N 3°10′44″W	Category B	29405	Upload another image
75-115 (Odd Nos) Newington Road And 55 Salisbury Road				55°56′16″N 3°10′40″W	Category B	29407	Upload another image
56-66 (Even Nos) Newington Road And 1 And 2 West Newington Place				55°56′16″N 3°10′43″W	Category B	29410	Upload Photo
4, 5 And 6 Nicolson Square				55°56′46″N 3°11′09″W	Category B	29412	Upload Photo
Nicolson Street, 86-90				55°56′42″N 3°11′01″W	Category B	29422	Upload Photo
19 And 20 Minto Street, Including Boundary Walls And Pedestrian Gates				55°56′06″N 3°10′30″W	Category B	29350	Upload Photo
21 Minto Street, Including Boundary Walls And Pier				55°56′06″N 3°10′30″W	Category B	29351	Upload Photo

== Key ==
The scheme for classifying buildings in Scotland is:

- Category A: "buildings of national or international importance, either architectural or historic; or fine, little-altered examples of some particular period, style or building type."
- Category B: "buildings of regional or more than local importance; or major examples of some particular period, style or building type, which may have been altered."
- Category C: "buildings of local importance; lesser examples of any period, style, or building type, as originally constructed or moderately altered; and simple traditional buildings which group well with other listed buildings."

In March 2016 there were 47,288 listed buildings in Scotland. Of these, 8% were Category A, and 50% were Category B, with the remaining 42% being Category C.

== See also ==
- List of listed buildings in Edinburgh
