= List of listed buildings in Edinburgh/13 =

This is a list of listed buildings in Edinburgh, Scotland.

== List ==
Name	Location	Date listed	Grid ref. (Note: Sometimes known as OSGB36, the grid reference (where provided) is based on the British national grid reference system used by the Ordnance Survey. • "Guide to National Grid". Ordnance Survey. • "Get-a-map". Ordnance Survey.)	Geo-coordinates	Notes	LB number (Note: Historic Environment Scotland assign a unique alphanumeric identifier to each designated site in Scotland, for listed buildings this always begins with "LB", for example "LB12345".)	Image
1 Priestfield Road North				55°56′11″N 3°10′02″W	Category B	43170	Upload Photo
3 Stoneycroft Road, Lodge St Margaret				55°59′21″N 3°23′43″W	Category B	40402	Upload Photo
Echline Farmhouse, Echline				55°59′09″N 3°25′07″W	Category B	40350	Upload Photo
22/1 -22/7 (Inclusive Numbers) Newhalls Road, Bridge House, Including Boundary Walls				55°59′24″N 3°23′11″W	Category C(S)	40356	Upload Photo
8 And 10 Edinburgh Road, Anchor Inn				55°59′23″N 3°23′33″W	Category C(S)	40364	Upload Photo
12 Edinburgh Road				55°59′23″N 3°23′33″W	Category C(S)	40365	Upload Photo
14 Edinburgh Road				55°59′23″N 3°23′32″W	Category C(S)	40366	Upload Photo
16 Edinburgh Road				55°59′23″N 3°23′32″W	Category C(S)	40367	Upload Photo
3 High Street				55°59′26″N 3°23′50″W	Category C(S)	40373	Upload Photo
147 Whitehouse Loan (Formerly No 17) The White House Incl Carriage House, Gates, Gatepiers And Boundary Walls				55°55′58″N 3°12′01″W	Category B	30668	Upload Photo
102 And 102B Whitehouse Loan 1B Greenhill Terrace Former Warrender Church Including Church Hall And Gatepiers				55°56′08″N 3°12′07″W	Category B	30670	Upload Photo
5 And 5A Whitehouse Terrace Including Gatepiers Pedestrians Gateway And Boundary Walls				55°55′54″N 3°11′48″W	Category C(S)	30674	Upload Photo
6 Whitehouse Terr Incl Gatepiers And Boundary Walls				55°55′54″N 3°11′45″W	Category C(S)	30675	Upload Photo
2 & 4 South Oswald Rd (Formerly 6 Blackford Ave St Raphaels)Including Chapel, Gatepiers And Boundary Walls				55°55′45″N 3°11′22″W	Category B	30592	Upload Photo
8 Spottiswoode Street				55°56′20″N 3°11′52″W	Category B	30600	Upload Photo
19A & 19B Strathearn Road Incl Gatepiers And Boundary Wall				55°56′04″N 3°11′41″W	Category B	30604	Upload Photo
6 7 8 And 8A Warrender Park Crescent Including Railings				55°56′17″N 3°12′07″W	Category B	30610	Upload Photo
15-17 (Inclusive Nos) Warrender Park Crescent				55°56′18″N 3°12′05″W	Category B	30613	Upload Photo
85-89(Odd Nos) Warrender Park Road				55°56′18″N 3°11′54″W	Category B	30628	Upload Photo
129-133 (Odd Nos) Warrender Park Road				55°56′16″N 3°12′04″W	Category B	30637	Upload Photo
135-139 (Odd Nos) Warrender Park Road				55°56′16″N 3°12′05″W	Category B	30638	Upload Photo
17-19 (Incl Nos) Warrender Park Terrace Including Railings				55°56′21″N 3°11′50″W	Category B	30650	Upload Photo
113 & 113A Whitehouse Loan Gillis College (Formerly St Margaret's Convent) Conventual Buildings Including Former Dairy, Sundial, Gatepiers, And Boundary Walls				55°56′05″N 3°12′04″W	Category B	30665	Upload Photo
131 Grange Loan Tyne Lodge				55°55′51″N 3°11′38″W	Category B	30510	Upload Photo
15 Hope Terrace				55°56′00″N 3°11′52″W	Category C(S)	30526	Upload Photo
37-41 (Odd Nos) Marchmont Road				55°56′17″N 3°11′40″W	Category B	30545	Upload Photo
18 Marchmont Road				55°56′20″N 3°11′44″W	Category B	30555	Upload Photo
32-38 (Even Nos) Marchmont Road & 56-60 Warrender Park Road				55°56′17″N 3°11′43″W	Category B	30557	Upload Photo
104-110 (Even Nos) Marchmont Road & 1-5 Odd Spottiswoode Rd				55°56′10″N 3°11′41″W	Category B	30562	Upload Photo
3 Marchmont Street				55°56′18″N 3°12′03″W	Category B	30570	Upload Photo
10 And 11 Marchmont Street				55°56′19″N 3°12′01″W	Category B	30574	Upload Photo
20 Mortonhall Road Blackford Mount Gatepiers And Boundary Wall				55°55′40″N 3°11′35″W	Category B	30582	Upload Photo
2 Oswald Rd Incl Boundary Walls Pedestrian Gate And Railings				55°55′49″N 3°11′36″W	Category B	30587	Upload Photo
117-121 (Odd Nos) Marchmont Road				55°56′07″N 3°11′38″W	Category B	30449	Upload another image
48-54 (Even Nos) Mayfield Road				55°55′53″N 3°10′37″W	Category C(S)	30451	Upload Photo
1-3 (Odd Nos) Roseneath Terrace And 31-34 (Inclusive Nos) Argyle Place				55°56′21″N 3°11′30″W	Category B	30465	Upload another image
Sciennes House Place, Jewish Burial Ground With Graveyard Walls, Gates And Railings				55°56′15″N 3°10′54″W	Category B	30476	Upload another image
2 And 3 Sylvan Place				55°56′21″N 3°11′26″W	Category B	30483	Upload Photo
11 And 13 Tantallon Place With Gateways And Boundary Walls				55°56′14″N 3°11′09″W	Category B	30486	Upload Photo
26-30 (Even Nos) Warrender Park Road And 22-30 (Even Nos) Marchmont Crescent				55°56′17″N 3°11′34″W	Category B	30491	Upload another image
34 Grange Loan				55°56′02″N 3°10′46″W	Category C(S)	30382	Upload Photo
46 Grange Road				55°56′09″N 3°11′13″W	Category C(S)	30394	Upload Photo
19 Grange Terrace "South Park" Including Boundary Walls And Gatepiers				55°55′47″N 3°11′20″W	Category B	30398	Upload Photo
7 And 7B Kilgraston Road Including Boundary Walls And Pedestrian Gateway				55°55′59″N 3°11′34″W	Category B	30402	Upload Photo
37A, 37B, 37C And 39 Lauder Road				55°56′11″N 3°11′15″W	Category C(S)	30407	Upload Photo
2 Lauder Road, Douglas House Including Gatepiers And Boundary Wall				55°55′57″N 3°11′03″W	Category B	30411	Upload Photo
40 Lauder Road				55°56′11″N 3°11′18″W	Category C(S)	30416	Upload Photo
68-72 (Even Nos) Marchmont Crescent				55°56′13″N 3°11′36″W	Category B	30438	Upload another image
86-90 (Even Nos) Marchmont Crescent				55°56′11″N 3°11′38″W	Category B	30441	Upload Photo
105-109 (Odd Nos) Marchmont Road				55°56′08″N 3°11′38″W	Category B	30447	Upload another image
1 Lauriston Place, Royal Infirmary, Former Ear Nose And Throat And Ophthalmological Pavilions				55°56′39″N 3°11′40″W	Category B	30308	Upload another image
57 And 59 Lochend Road And 1,2,3,17 And 18 Upper Hermitage, Telford College Lochend Annexe With Gates, Railings, Gatepiers And Overthrow				55°58′01″N 3°09′51″W	Category C(S)	30330	Upload Photo
1-3 (Inclusive Argyle Park Terrace				55°56′22″N 3°11′33″W	Category B	30331	Upload Photo
18-21 (Inclusive Nos) Argyle Place				55°56′18″N 3°11′30″W	Category B	30338	Upload another image
22-27 (Inclusive Nos) Argyle Place				55°56′19″N 3°11′30″W	Category B	30339	Upload another image
11 Dalrymple Crescent Including Boundary Wall				55°56′03″N 3°10′53″W	Category C(S)	30351	Upload Photo
10 Dalrymple Crescent Including Boundary Wall				55°56′02″N 3°10′54″W	Category C(S)	30352	Upload Photo
57 Fountainhall Road Including Boundary Walls And Gatepiers				55°55′50″N 3°11′04″W	Category C(S)	30374	Upload Photo
Dean Path, K6 Telephone Kiosk				55°57′09″N 3°13′01″W	Category B	30229	Upload Photo
Corstorphine Road, K6 Telephone Kiosk At Gates To Edinburgh Zoo (Royal Zoological Society Of Scotland)				55°56′32″N 3°16′09″W	Category B	30230	Upload another image
Princes Street At Royal Scottish Academy, Police Box				55°57′07″N 3°11′44″W	Category B	30243	Upload Photo
Register Place, Police Box Opposite Cafe Royal				55°57′14″N 3°11′26″W	Category B	30247	Upload Photo
117 Fountainbridge, Tollcross Primary School, Including Boundary Wall, Gatepiers And Railings				55°56′36″N 3°12′23″W	Category B	30253	Upload Photo
11 Ellersly Road, Westerlea House (Capability Scotland), Including Gardens				55°56′47″N 3°14′55″W	Category B	30275	Upload Photo
5 Easter Belmont Road, Brucehill				55°56′53″N 3°15′15″W	Category B	30293	Upload Photo
4 Essex Road, Almondale, Including Gatepiers And Boundary Walls				55°58′04″N 3°18′36″W	Category B	30298	Upload Photo
141 Princes Street				55°57′02″N 3°12′25″W	Category B	30300	Upload Photo
21 And 23 Thistle Street				55°57′16″N 3°11′49″W	Category B	30301	Upload Photo
85 Lasswade Road And 1-8 (Inclusive Nos) "Mount Alvernia", Former Convent Of The Poor Clares Colettines, Including Gatepiers And Boundary Walls				55°54′34″N 3°09′22″W	Category B	30303	Upload Photo
3-29 (Odd Nos) North Bridge, Carlton Hotel				55°57′04″N 3°11′16″W	Category B	30142	Upload Photo
139 And 140 Princes Street And 5 Hope Street Lane				55°57′02″N 3°12′25″W	Category A	30149	Upload Photo
24 Russell Place, Gothic Cottage, With Boundary Wall				55°58′42″N 3°12′19″W	Category A	30157	Upload Photo
2-10 (Even Nos) St Giles Street				55°56′59″N 3°11′31″W	Category B	30161	Upload Photo
30-68 (Even Nos) St Mary's Street, 1-7 (Odd Nos) Holyrood Road And 2 And 4 Boyd's Entry Including Boundary Wall To Gullane's Close				55°56′58″N 3°10′59″W	Category B	30168	Upload another image
St Stephen Place, 13				55°57′28″N 3°12′27″W	Category B	30169	Upload Photo
St Stephen Street 63-73				55°57′30″N 3°12′23″W	Category B	30170	Upload Photo
St Stephen Street 75, 77				55°57′30″N 3°12′22″W	Category B	30171	Upload Photo
110 St Stephen Street				55°57′30″N 3°12′18″W	Category C(S)	30173	Upload Photo
32, 34, 36 Shandwick Place				55°57′00″N 3°12′35″W	Category B	30182	Upload Photo
52, 54, 56 Shandwick Place				55°56′59″N 3°12′37″W	Category C(S)	30183	Upload Photo
108 West Bow				55°56′53″N 3°11′39″W	Category B	30192	Upload Photo
West Port, Former Salvation Army Women's Hostel				55°56′48″N 3°11′52″W	Category C(S)	30196	Upload another image
100 Spring Gardens, Elsie Inglis Nursing Home (Former Elsie Inglis Memorial Hospital)				55°57′16″N 3°09′58″W	Category C(S)	30198	Upload Photo
Gorgie Road, Stenhouse-Saughton Church (Church Of Scotland), Halls, Boundary Walls And Railings				55°55′51″N 3°15′09″W	Category B	30211	Upload Photo
158A Lower Granton Road				55°58′50″N 3°13′20″W	Category C(S)	30214	Upload Photo
Granton Harbour, Mid Pier, Stone-Built Warehouse				55°59′06″N 3°13′22″W	Category B	30217	Upload Photo
Barnton Avenue West, Barnton House (Formerly) West Lodge Gatepiers				55°57′58″N 3°18′26″W	Category B	30052	Upload Photo
The Causeway, 43-47 (Odd Nos) Sheep Heid Inn, Duddingston				55°56′31″N 3°08′55″W	Category B	30077	Upload another image
31 And 33 Cockburn Street				55°57′03″N 3°11′24″W	Category B	30079	Upload Photo
Comely Bank 1, 3				55°57′35″N 3°13′09″W	Category B	30095	Upload Photo
123 George Street With Railings				55°57′09″N 3°12′18″W	Category B	30104	Upload Photo
92 George Street And 80 Rose Street Lane North				55°57′08″N 3°12′08″W	Category B	30108	Upload Photo
9-16 (Inclusive Nos) George Iv Bridge				55°56′53″N 3°11′32″W	Category B	30110	Upload another image
92 Grassmarket				55°56′53″N 3°11′43″W	Category B	30113	Upload Photo
4 High Riggs, Main Point				55°56′45″N 3°12′08″W	Category B	30116	Upload another image
6 Lennox Row, Grecian Cottage, With Gatepiers And Boundary Wall				55°58′42″N 3°12′17″W	Category B	30132	Upload Photo
1 - 2 Royal Terrace Gardens				55°57′27″N 3°10′50″W	Category B	30133	Upload Photo
29-39 (Odd Nos) Lothian Street				55°56′47″N 3°11′20″W	Category B	30134	Upload Photo
49-53 (Odd Nos) Lothian Street				55°56′46″N 3°11′22″W	Category B	30137	Upload Photo
69-73 (Odd Nos) York Place, Including Railings				55°57′23″N 3°11′17″W	Category A	29974	Upload another image
6 York Place, Including Railings				55°57′22″N 3°11′33″W	Category A	29976	Upload Photo
12 York Place, Including Railings And Lamps				55°57′22″N 3°11′31″W	Category A	29979	Upload Photo
14 York Place, Including Railings And Lamps				55°57′22″N 3°11′31″W	Category A	29980	Upload Photo
Apostolic Church Davie St And West Richmond Street				55°56′44″N 3°10′59″W	Category B	30009	Upload Photo
2 Roxburgh Place, Former Roxy Arts Centre And Lady Glenorchy Parish Church				55°56′50″N 3°11′03″W	Category B	30012	Upload Photo
Forrest Road And Bristo Place, Bedlam Theatre (Former New North Free Church), Including Boundary Walls				55°56′46″N 3°11′27″W	Category B	30020	Upload another image
96 George Street, Freemasons' Hall				55°57′08″N 3°12′09″W	Category A	30024	Upload Photo
Slateford Railway Viaduct Over Inglis Green Road, Gray's Mill Lade, And Water Of Leith				55°55′25″N 3°14′59″W	Category B	30038	Upload another image
Union Canal Calder Road Bridge				55°55′14″N 3°18′07″W	Category B	30039	Upload Photo
Flora Stevenson Primary School And Schoolhouse, Comely Bank				55°57′30″N 3°13′30″W	Category B	30045	Upload Photo
High School Yards, Chisholm House, Including Railings				55°56′56″N 3°11′02″W	Category B	30049	Upload Photo
Whitehill Street 32-44 Newcraighall				55°56′08″N 3°05′18″W	Category C(S)	29915	Upload Photo
Whitehill Street 46-58 Newcraighall				55°56′10″N 3°05′15″W	Category C(S)	29916	Upload Photo
1-5 (Inclusive Numbers) Duddingston Mills With Boundary Wall				55°56′47″N 3°08′07″W	Category C(S)	29940	Upload Photo
15-19A (Odd Nos) York Place, Including Railings And Lamps				55°57′21″N 3°11′28″W	Category A	29962	Upload Photo
21-23 (Consecutive Nos) Wardie Square				55°58′47″N 3°13′04″W	Category C(S)	29885	Upload Photo
6-14 (Even Nos) Waterloo Place				55°57′12″N 3°11′15″W	Category A	29898	Upload another image
18-30 (Even Numbers) Stafford Street, 3, 5 William Street				55°57′00″N 3°12′43″W	Category B	29831	Upload Photo
Starbank Road, 3 And 3A Newhaven				55°58′49″N 3°11′55″W	Category B	29833	Upload Photo
63-67 (Odd Nos) Thistle Street				55°57′14″N 3°12′00″W	Category B	29839	Upload Photo
32-38 (Even Nos) Thistle Street				55°57′14″N 3°11′56″W	Category C(S)	29841	Upload Photo
46 And 48 Thistle Street				55°57′14″N 3°11′57″W	Category B	29843	Upload Photo
3-25 (Odd Nos) Torphichen Street, Including Railings				55°56′50″N 3°12′46″W	Category B	29848	Upload Photo
14-22 (Even Nos) Torphichen Street And 1, 1A Torphichen Place, Including Railings				55°56′49″N 3°12′49″W	Category B	29850	Upload Photo
6, 7 And 8 Trinity Crescent, With Boundary Wall				55°58′48″N 3°12′20″W	Category B	29852	Upload Photo
40 East Trinity Road, Laverockbank Cottage, With Boundary Wall				55°58′38″N 3°12′00″W	Category C(S)	29858	Upload Photo
1-6 (Inclusive Nos) India Buildings, Victoria Street				55°56′55″N 3°11′35″W	Category A	29868	Upload Photo
22-36 (Even Nos) Victoria Street				55°56′55″N 3°11′38″W	Category B	29872	Upload another image
4, 6, 8, 10 Walker Street				55°56′55″N 3°12′47″W	Category A	29881	Upload Photo
39-43 (Odd Nos) Scotland Street, Including Railings				55°57′38″N 3°11′42″W	Category B	29779	Upload Photo
2 Spylaw Avenue, Splyaw Bank House, With Boundary Wall, Gate Piers And Outbuildings				55°54′32″N 3°16′07″W	Category C(S)	29805	Upload Photo
4 Spylaw Avenue, With Boundary Wall, Gates, Gatepiers And Garage				55°54′30″N 3°16′03″W	Category B	29806	Upload Photo
6 And 6B Spylaw Park, Talgarth, With Garage, Boundary Wall, Gates And Gatepiers				55°54′29″N 3°16′07″W	Category B	29807	Upload Photo
10 Spylaw Park, Hartfell, With Former Stable, Outbuilding, Boundary Wall And Gatepiers				55°54′28″N 3°16′04″W	Category B	29808	Upload Photo
25A Spylaw Street With Gate Piers And Gates				55°54′27″N 3°15′30″W	Category C(S)	29823	Upload Photo
St John Street, Moray House Reception, (Former Moray House Nursery School)				55°57′02″N 3°10′50″W	Category B	29729	Upload another image
1 And 2 St Patrick Street And 23 West Crosscauseway				55°56′37″N 3°11′01″W	Category C(S)	29739	Upload Photo
St Stephen Street 5-13 And 6-10 Baker's Place				55°57′27″N 3°12′27″W	Category B	29743	Upload Photo
St Stephen Street 31-39 And 2-12 St Stephen Place				55°57′29″N 3°12′25″W	Category B	29745	Upload Photo
8, 8A And 8B Salisbury Road, Including Gatepiers And Boundary Walls				55°56′16″N 3°10′35″W	Category B	29760	Upload Photo
Saxe Coburg Street 3-7A				55°57′36″N 3°12′24″W	Category B	29769	Upload Photo
29-31A (Odd Nos) Scotland Street, Including Railings				55°57′37″N 3°11′42″W	Category B	29777	Upload Photo
1 And 2 Rustic Cottages With Boundary Wall And Gates				55°54′29″N 3°15′10″W	Category B	29682	Upload Photo
1 Rutland Square And 28 Rutland Street, Including Railings				55°56′56″N 3°12′30″W	Category A	29686	Upload another image
5-9 (Odd Nos) South St Andrew Street				55°57′12″N 3°11′29″W	Category B	29709	Upload Photo
St Bernard's Crescent 4-10A				55°57′26″N 3°12′43″W	Category A	29714	Upload another image
13, 14, 15, 16 Rothesay Place				55°57′00″N 3°13′06″W	Category B	29665	Upload Photo
4, 5, 6 Rothesay Terrace				55°57′04″N 3°13′00″W	Category B	29669	Upload Photo
65 And 67 Rose Street And 45 And 47 Rose Street North Lane				55°57′09″N 3°11′57″W	Category B	29635	Upload Photo
71 And 73 Rose Street				55°57′09″N 3°11′58″W	Category B	29636	Upload Photo

== Key ==
The scheme for classifying buildings in Scotland is:

- Category A: "buildings of national or international importance, either architectural or historic; or fine, little-altered examples of some particular period, style or building type."
- Category B: "buildings of regional or more than local importance; or major examples of some particular period, style or building type, which may have been altered."
- Category C: "buildings of local importance; lesser examples of any period, style, or building type, as originally constructed or moderately altered; and simple traditional buildings which group well with other listed buildings."

In March 2016 there were 47,288 listed buildings in Scotland. Of these, 8% were Category A, and 50% were Category B, with the remaining 42% being Category C.

== See also ==
- List of listed buildings in Edinburgh
