= List of listed buildings in Edinburgh/32 =

This is a list of listed buildings in Edinburgh, Scotland.

== List ==
Name	Location	Date Listed	Grid Ref. (Note: Sometimes known as OSGB36, the grid reference (where provided) is based on the British national grid reference system used by the Ordnance Survey. • "Guide to National Grid". Ordnance Survey. • "Get-a-map". Ordnance Survey.)	Geo-coordinates	Notes	LB Number (Note: Historic Environment Scotland assign a unique alphanumeric identifier to each designated site in Scotland, for listed buildings this always begins with "LB", for example "LB12345".)	Image
Drylaw House, Gatepiers At Original Principal Entrance To Drylaw House				55°57′54″N 3°15′11″W	Category B	28063	Upload Photo
Stockbridge Primary School Hamilton Place				55°57′34″N 3°12′27″W	Category B	27988	Upload Photo
South Bridge, Chambers Street, South College Street And West College Street, University Of Edinburgh Old College, Including Gates And Lamp Standards				55°56′51″N 3°11′12″W	Category A	27989	Upload Photo
9-16 (Inclusive Nos) Chambers Street, Charles Stewart House				55°56′53″N 3°11′18″W	Category B	27991	Upload Photo
Teviot Place, Teviot Row House, University Of Edinburgh Students Union				55°56′42″N 3°11′19″W	Category B	27998	Upload another image
4 Kirk Cramond, Cramond Tower				55°58′44″N 3°17′53″W	Category B	28018	Upload Photo
19 Water Street, Lamb's House				55°58′31″N 3°10′11″W	Category A	27915	Upload another image
West Meadows Park, Sundial, Railings And Gate				55°56′30″N 3°11′56″W	Category B	27930	Upload another image
Regent Road, New Calton Burial Ground, Including Watch Tower And Boundary Walls				55°57′13″N 3°10′35″W	Category B	27931	Upload another image
King's Stables Road, King's Bridge				55°56′51″N 3°12′06″W	Category A	27943	Upload another image
Regent Road Retaining Wall				55°57′15″N 3°11′05″W	Category B	27946	Upload another image
Lauriston Place, Edinburgh College Of Art, Including Retaining Wall, Gatepiers And Railings				55°56′45″N 3°11′59″W	Category A	27974	Upload Photo
Fettes College Carrington Road Fettes Avenue And Crewe Road South				55°57′50″N 3°13′35″W	Category A	27975	Upload Photo
East Princes Street Gardens, Scott Monument With Retaining Wall And Steps				55°57′09″N 3°11′36″W	Category A	27829	Upload another image
West Mains Of Ingliston Farmhouse				55°56′23″N 3°22′41″W	Category C(S)	27836	Upload Photo
4, 5 Parliament Street, Model Lodging House				55°58′29″N 3°10′22″W	Category C(S)	27837	Upload Photo
Chambers, Wm. Statue Chambers Street				55°56′51″N 3°11′22″W	Category B	27849	Upload another image
47 And 49 Queen Charlotte Street And Railings				55°58′25″N 3°10′00″W	Category B	27861	Upload Photo
St Andrew Square, Monument To John, 4Th Earl Of Hopetoun				55°57′16″N 3°11′30″W	Category A	27862	Upload another image
55 And 57 Queen Charlotte Street				55°58′24″N 3°09′58″W	Category B	27865	Upload Photo
Melville Crescent, 2Nd Viscount Melville Monument				55°56′59″N 3°12′50″W	Category A	27866	Upload another image
65 Queen Charlotte Street With Boundary Walls And Gatepiers				55°58′24″N 3°09′56″W	Category B	27869	Upload Photo
West Princes Street Gardens, Sir James Young Simpson Monument				55°57′01″N 3°12′18″W	Category B	27876	Upload another image
West Princes Street Gardens, Statuary Group (The Genius of Architecture Crowning the Theory and Practice of Art)				55°57′04″N 3°11′54″W	Category B	27888	Upload another image See more images
West Bow, Bowfoot Well				55°56′53″N 3°11′40″W	Category A	27893	Upload Photo
58, 59 Timberbush				55°58′35″N 3°10′08″W	Category B	27910	Upload Photo
Ratho Village, 81 Main Street, Hawthorn Cottage And Boundary Wall				55°55′17″N 3°22′52″W	Category C(S)	27749	Upload Photo
Ratho Village, 32-34 (Even Nos) Main Street, Masonic Villas And Boundary Wall				55°55′20″N 3°22′43″W	Category B	27753	Upload Photo
Ratho Village, 42 Main Street, Ratho Bowling And Recreation Club And Boundary Wall				55°55′19″N 3°22′46″W	Category C(S)	27761	Upload Photo
2 West Brighton Crescent				55°57′05″N 3°07′05″W	Category B	27775	Upload Photo
8 West Brighton Crescent				55°57′05″N 3°07′07″W	Category B	27786	Upload Photo
14 South St Andrew Street, Former Young Men's Christian Association				55°57′12″N 3°11′31″W	Category B	27788	Upload Photo
High Street, Mercat Cross				55°56′59″N 3°11′25″W	Category A	27792	Upload Photo
Union Canal, East Hermiston Bridge, Bridge No 10				55°55′15″N 3°18′40″W	Category B	27798	Upload Photo
30 And 32 Maritime Street				55°58′31″N 3°10′05″W	Category C(S)	27808	Upload Photo
Union Canal, Bridge No 16 (Near Clifton Hall)				55°55′19″N 3°25′13″W	Category B	27821	Upload Photo
Ratho Park Stables And Steading				55°55′26″N 3°21′55″W	Category B	27675	Upload Photo
1 Rosefield Place				55°57′06″N 3°07′02″W	Category C(S)	27676	Upload Photo
Ratho Village, 49 Baird Road (Former Lodge) And Boundary Wall				55°55′29″N 3°22′49″W	Category B	27700	Upload Photo
172 Leith Walk, Craig And Rose Plc				55°58′04″N 3°10′29″W	Category C(S)	27702	Upload Photo
Parliament Square, Signet Library, Including Railings				55°56′57″N 3°11′30″W	Category A	27709	Upload another image
6 Rosefield Place				55°57′08″N 3°07′03″W	Category C(S)	27711	Upload Photo
12 And 14 Regent Street				55°57′10″N 3°06′45″W	Category C(S)	27584	Upload Photo
George Iv Bridge, Edinburgh Central Public Library, Including Balustrade, Gatepiers, Gates Lamp Standards And Railings				55°56′54″N 3°11′33″W	Category B	27587	Upload another image See more images
22 Regent Street				55°57′11″N 3°06′44″W	Category C(S)	27594	Upload Photo
58-66 (Even Nos) Morningside Road				55°55′57″N 3°12′37″W	Category B	27596	Upload Photo
Leith Docks, Edinburgh Dry Dock Pumping House				55°58′38″N 3°09′35″W	Category B	27615	Upload Photo
Newliston House, South Lodge				55°56′35″N 3°25′25″W	Category B	27617	Upload Photo
Leith Docks, Imperial Dock Grain Elevator				55°58′47″N 3°09′43″W	Category B	27619	Upload Photo
36 Regent Street				55°57′12″N 3°06′42″W	Category C(S)	27624	Upload Photo
38 Regent Street				55°57′12″N 3°06′42″W	Category C(S)	27628	Upload Photo
162-168 (Even Nos) Great Junction Street				55°58′25″N 3°10′34″W	Category B	27512	Upload Photo
St Peter's Church (Episcopal) 16 Lutton Place Newington				55°56′24″N 3°10′44″W	Category A	27514	Upload another image
302 And 304 Portobello High Street, 2 Bellfield Street				55°57′05″N 3°06′32″W	Category C(S)	27516	Upload Photo
83-91A (Odd Nos) Henderson Street				55°58′29″N 3°10′20″W	Category C(S)	27525	Upload Photo
17-18 John's Place (Formerly 14 John's Place 18 Wellington Place)				55°58′19″N 3°10′04″W	Category B	27550	Upload Photo
High Street And Hunter Square, Tron Church				55°57′00″N 3°11′16″W	Category A	27552	Upload another image
13 Junction Place, Leith Victoria Public Baths				55°58′17″N 3°10′31″W	Category B	27560	Upload Photo
53 Regent Street Including Boundary Walls And Railings				55°57′14″N 3°06′37″W	Category C(S)	27576	Upload Photo
96 And 98 Portobello High Street, 2 And 4 Figgate Street				55°57′15″N 3°06′58″W	Category C(S)	27452	Upload Photo
7-17 (Odd Nos) Great Junction Street				55°58′14″N 3°10′21″W	Category B	27469	Upload Photo
Kirkliston Village, 7 And 9 (Odd Nos), High Street				55°57′15″N 3°24′03″W	Category C(S)	27471	Upload Photo
Kirkliston Village, 19 High Street				55°57′15″N 3°24′05″W	Category C(S)	27490	Upload Photo
106/01 Constitution Street, St Mary Star Of The Sea, Halls, Former School				55°58′26″N 3°10′10″W	Category C(S)	27372	Upload Photo
132 Constitution Street With Boundary Walls And Railings				55°58′21″N 3°10′09″W	Category B	27379	Upload Photo
62 Hermiston, Former Lodge To Hermiston House With Boundary Wall And Gatepiers				55°55′03″N 3°19′16″W	Category B	27403	Upload Photo
183-193 (Odd Nos) Portobello High Street (Including Baptist Church)				55°57′09″N 3°06′50″W	Category B	27405	Upload Photo
Hermitage Of Braid, Off Braid Road				55°55′12″N 3°12′03″W	Category A	27407	Upload Photo
34-36 (Even Numbers) Spylaw Road Modern Addition Excluded				55°55′56″N 3°13′13″W	Category C(S)	27417	Upload Photo
85, 85A Duke Street				55°58′10″N 3°10′06″W	Category C(S)	27425	Upload Photo
62 Portobello High Street And Flats 1 And 2, 2 Pipe Street				55°57′17″N 3°07′01″W	Category C(S)	27445	Upload Photo
15 Marlborough Street, Portobello United Reformed Church (Former Congregational Church)				55°57′09″N 3°06′40″W	Category B	27308	Upload Photo
41 Marlborough Street				55°57′12″N 3°06′36″W	Category C(S)	27322	Upload Photo
24 Polwarth Terrace With Boundary Wall Gatepiers And Railings				55°56′08″N 3°13′12″W	Category B	27342	Upload Photo
24 Marlborough Street (Wellington Cottage), Including Boundary Wall And Railings				55°57′10″N 3°06′37″W	Category B	27343	Upload Photo
13 Greenhill Gardens With Boundary Wall And Gatepiers				55°56′06″N 3°12′22″W	Category B	27352	Upload Photo
Westgarth Avenue, St Cuthbert's Episcopal Church With Hall, Boundary Wall, Gatepiers And Lamp-Post				55°54′27″N 3°15′13″W	Category A	27353	Upload Photo
Heriot-Watt University, Riccarton Estate, Gardener's House, Boundary Wall And Railings				55°54′35″N 3°19′05″W	Category B	27355	Upload Photo
32 Marlborough Street				55°57′11″N 3°06′35″W	Category C(S)	27357	Upload Photo
6 Glasgow Road, Middle Norton				55°56′15″N 3°22′04″W	Category C(S)	27236	Upload Photo
133 Constitution Street				55°58′19″N 3°10′09″W	Category B	27240	Upload Photo
76 And 78 (1-7) North Junction Street North Leith Mill; Eh6 6Ht				55°58′39″N 3°10′47″W	Category B	27284	Upload Photo
5 Cluny Drive And 8C, 8C/1 And 8C/2 Hermitage Gardens				55°55′25″N 3°12′29″W	Category C(S)	27109	Upload Photo
139A Bonnington Road, Bonnington Primary School With Play Shelters, Gatepiers And Railings				55°58′13″N 3°10′47″W	Category C(S)	27027	Upload Photo
92 Restalrig Road				55°58′02″N 3°09′27″W	Category C(S)	27044	Upload Photo
Foxhall (Todshaugh) With Walled Garden, Garden Shelter And Garden Door				55°57′10″N 3°23′34″W	Category B	27051	Upload Photo
466 Lanark Road West, Newmills Farmhouse With Boundary Wall				55°53′23″N 3°20′00″W	Category B	27055	Upload Photo
3 And 4 Lower Joppa				55°57′01″N 3°05′58″W	Category C(S)	27063	Upload Photo
Casselbank Street, Elder Memorial Church, Free Church Of Scotland				55°58′12″N 3°10′25″W	Category B	27088	Upload Photo
9 John Street				55°57′05″N 3°06′16″W	Category C(S)	26941	Upload Photo
34 Colinton Road Hollywood With Stable Block Greenhouse Boundary Walls Gatepiers And Railings				55°55′50″N 3°13′23″W	Category B	26942	Upload Photo
1 Johnsburn Road Balerno Parish Church With Boundary Wall And Railings				55°53′04″N 3°20′26″W	Category C(S)	26944	Upload Photo
First Church Of Christ Scientist Inverleith Terrace				55°57′48″N 3°12′16″W	Category B	26949	Upload Photo
40 Colinton Road				55°55′47″N 3°13′32″W	Category B	26966	Upload another image
219 (Pf1 & 2, 1F1 & 2, 2F1 & 2) Ferry Road, Taap Hall With Boundary Walls And Outbuildings; Eh6 4Nn				55°58′24″N 3°11′28″W	Category B	26975	Upload Photo
Gogar Parish Church (Formerly C Of S) And Churchyard Glasgow Road				55°56′19″N 3°19′59″W	Category B	26984	Upload Photo
2, 4 And 4A John Street				55°57′06″N 3°06′18″W	Category C(S)	26988	Upload Photo
82 Colinton Road Waverley House With Boundary Walls And Gatepiers				55°55′33″N 3°14′04″W	Category B	27012	Upload Photo
1 Hermitage Place With Boundary Wall				55°58′09″N 3°09′50″W	Category B	26868	Upload Photo
40 Bath Street				55°57′16″N 3°06′42″W	Category C(S)	26870	Upload Photo
3 And 5 Smith's Place				55°58′03″N 3°10′26″W	Category B	26871	Upload Photo
4 Harlaw Road And Boundary Wall				55°52′53″N 3°20′20″W	Category C(S)	26895	Upload Photo
Craiglockhart Parish Church (C Of S) Craiglockhart Avenue And Craiglockhart Drive North				55°55′18″N 3°14′34″W	Category B	26900	Upload another image See more images
Clifton Hall Policies, East Lodge				55°55′32″N 3°25′19″W	Category B	26903	Upload Photo
55-59A (Odd Nos) Ferry Road With Carriage Arches, Gatepiers, Boundary Walls And Railings (Formerly Bank Place); Eh6 4Aq				55°58′29″N 3°10′53″W	Category B	26914	Upload Photo
5 John Street				55°57′04″N 3°06′17″W	Category B	26916	Upload Photo
4 And 6 Bellfield Street				55°57′06″N 3°06′32″W	Category C(S)	26920	Upload Photo
7 John Street (Arnprior) With Boundary Walls And Railings				55°57′05″N 3°06′16″W	Category B	26929	Upload Photo
32 Colinton Road Boroughfield With Boundary Walls And Gatepiers				55°55′50″N 3°13′21″W	Category C(S)	26930	Upload Photo
40-44 Bruntsfield Gardens And 8 Forbes Road				55°56′06″N 3°12′28″W	Category B	26835	Upload Photo
Glenbrook Road, House Of Cockburn, Cottage, Stables And Mill				55°52′37″N 3°22′16″W	Category B	26843	Upload Photo
7 Claremont Park And 1 Claremont Road With Boundary Wall And Gatepiers				55°58′11″N 3°09′20″W	Category B	26751	Upload Photo
17 Bath Street				55°57′12″N 3°06′46″W	Category C(S)	26766	Upload Photo
21 Bath Street				55°57′13″N 3°06′45″W	Category C(S)	26780	Upload Photo
7-23 (Odd Nos) Leith Walk And 2 - 22 (Even Nos) Duke Street, Former Leith Central Station Offices, Including Central And Northern Bars				55°58′13″N 3°10′18″W	Category A	26781	Upload Photo
67 Commercial Street, Custom House, With Stable Range; Eh6 6Lh				55°58′36″N 3°10′15″W	Category A	26787	Upload another image
1 Caledonian Crescent				55°56′37″N 3°12′57″W	Category C(S)	26708	Upload Photo
5 Claremont Park With Boundary Wall, Gatepiers And Lamp Brackets				55°58′11″N 3°09′25″W	Category B	26726	Upload Photo
Caledonian Road, Dalry Congregational Church				55°56′38″N 3°12′59″W	Category C(S)	26734	Upload Photo
Dalmeny Village, Main Street, Dalmeny War Memorial				55°58′56″N 3°22′24″W	Category C(S)	5543	Upload Photo
Carlowrie, Carlowrie Farmhouse, Including Garden Wall				55°57′55″N 3°21′46″W	Category C(S)	5554	Upload Photo
Dundas Castle, North Lodge, Including Gates And Gatepiers, Railings And Walls				55°58′41″N 3°23′51″W	Category B	5517	Upload Photo
Dundas Home Farm (Formerly Newbigging Farmhouse), Including Railings And Boundary Walls				55°58′43″N 3°24′01″W	Category C(S)	5521	Upload Photo
Dalmeny House, Including Terrace, Garden Walls, Railings, Gates And Gatepiers				55°59′17″N 3°20′05″W	Category A	82	Upload another image
945 Biggar Road, Milestone To N				55°53′32″N 3°12′05″W	Category C(S)	45833	Upload Photo
Buckstone Terrace, Milestone To N Of Entrance To Fairmilehead Water Treatment Works				55°54′11″N 3°12′20″W	Category C(S)	45835	Upload Photo
11 Swanston Village				55°53′29″N 3°13′04″W	Category B	45846	Upload Photo
21 And 23 Winton Loan				55°53′48″N 3°11′42″W	Category C(S)	45850	Upload Photo
24 Forth Street				55°57′29″N 3°11′12″W	Category B	45953	Upload Photo
Logie Green Road And Broughton Road, St Philip's, Episcopal Church And Hall Including Boundary Walls				55°57′49″N 3°11′44″W	Category C(S)	45957	Upload Photo
166 Easter Road, Former Guthrie Memorial Church With Boundary Wall And Railings				55°57′38″N 3°10′16″W	Category C(S)	46112	Upload Photo
11 Laverockbank Terrace, Former Free Church Manse, With Boundary And Retaining Walls				55°58′46″N 3°11′53″W	Category C(S)	46736	Upload Photo
12 And 12A Russell Place, Clairinsh. With Boundary Wall				55°58′38″N 3°12′17″W	Category C(S)	46748	Upload Photo
Warriston Gardens, Railway Bridge				55°58′11″N 3°12′02″W	Category B	46758	Upload Photo
32 York Road, Forthland House, With Gateway And Boundary Wall				55°58′44″N 3°12′10″W	Category C(S)	46766	Upload Photo
3-11 (Odd Nos) Archibald Place, With Boundary Wall And Railings				55°56′41″N 3°11′45″W	Category B	47024	Upload Photo
Forth Road Bridge With Approach Ramps And Piers				56°00′06″N 3°24′15″W	Category A	47778	Upload another image
The Loan, Queensferry Parish Church				55°59′18″N 3°23′49″W	Category C(S)	47786	Upload Photo
67-71 (Odd Nos) Grassmarket & 9-11 (Odd Nos) Gilmour Close, Including Stair Tower To Rear				55°56′51″N 3°11′41″W	Category B	47869	Upload Photo
20-24 (Even Nos) Lauriston Place Including Boundary Wall And Railings				55°56′42″N 3°11′46″W	Category B	47888	Upload another image
90 And 92 West Bow				55°56′54″N 3°11′40″W	Category C(S)	47905	Upload Photo
West Port, Police Box				55°56′48″N 3°11′53″W	Category B	47906	Upload another image
25 Greenbank Terrace With Boundary Wall, Gatepier And Railings				55°55′12″N 3°12′46″W	Category C(S)	48209	Upload Photo
Edinburgh Castle, Great Hall				55°56′53″N 3°12′00″W	Category A	48220	Upload Photo
Edinburgh Castle, Military Prison				55°56′53″N 3°12′02″W	Category B	48222	Upload Photo
4-6 (Inclusive Nos) Teviot Place				55°56′45″N 3°11′24″W	Category C(S)	48248	Upload Photo
West Princes Street Gardens, Shelters				55°57′06″N 3°11′53″W	Category B	48254	Upload Photo
Ravelston Dykes Road, Ice House (To Left Of No 37)				55°57′09″N 3°15′21″W	Category C(S)	48905	Upload Photo
Roseburn Cliff, Gatepiers				55°56′45″N 3°14′06″W	Category C(S)	48910	Upload Photo
31-33 (Inclusive Numbers) Duddingston Mills				55°56′46″N 3°08′08″W	Category C(S)	49041	Upload Photo

== Key ==
The scheme for classifying buildings in Scotland is:

- Category A: "buildings of national or international importance, either architectural or historic; or fine, little-altered examples of some particular period, style or building type."
- Category B: "buildings of regional or more than local importance; or major examples of some particular period, style or building type, which may have been altered."
- Category C: "buildings of local importance; lesser examples of any period, style, or building type, as originally constructed or moderately altered; and simple traditional buildings which group well with other listed buildings."

In March 2016 there were 47,288 listed buildings in Scotland. Of these, 8% were Category A, and 50% were Category B, with the remaining 42% being Category C.

== See also ==
- List of listed buildings in Edinburgh
