= List of listed buildings in Edinburgh/8 =

This is a list of listed buildings in Edinburgh, Scotland.

== List ==
Name	Location	Date Listed	Grid Ref. (Note: Sometimes known as OSGB36, the grid reference (where provided) is based on the British national grid reference system used by the Ordnance Survey. • "Guide to National Grid". Ordnance Survey. • "Get-a-map". Ordnance Survey.)	Geo-coordinates	Notes	LB Number (Note: Historic Environment Scotland assign a unique alphanumeric identifier to each designated site in Scotland, for listed buildings this always begins with "LB", for example "LB12345".)	Image
27-31 (Odd Nos) Causewayside				55°56′19″N 3°10′53″W	Category B	43144	Upload another image
45-79 (Odd Nos) Causewayside				55°56′17″N 3°10′52″W	Category C(S)	43145	Upload Photo
Dalkeith Road, Salisbury Green Gate Lodge				55°56′17″N 3°10′20″W	Category B	43151	Upload Photo
11 And 13 Marchhall Crescent				55°56′10″N 3°10′03″W	Category C(S)	43157	Upload Photo
43-45 (Inclusive Nos) West Preston Street And 15 - 19 (Odd Nos) Causewayside				55°56′20″N 3°10′53″W	Category B	43175	Upload another image
5 High Street				55°59′26″N 3°23′50″W	Category C(S)	40374	Upload Photo
17 High Street, Queensferry Arms Hotel				55°59′25″N 3°23′47″W	Category B	40376	Upload Photo
20, 21, 21A And 22 High Street				55°59′25″N 3°23′46″W	Category C(S)	40378	Upload Photo
2 And 3 Mid Terrace				55°59′23″N 3°23′44″W	Category C(S)	40396	Upload Photo
Station Road, 1, 3, 5 And 7 (Coach House) Ashburnham Gardens, Ashburnham House				55°59′15″N 3°23′08″W	Category B	40414	Upload Photo
8, 9/1, 9/2, 9/3 East Terrace				55°59′23″N 3°23′36″W	Category B	40340	Upload Photo
Newhalls Road, Hawes Pier, Lighthouse				55°59′35″N 3°23′13″W	Category B	40353	Upload another image
5 Edinburgh Road, Craig View				55°59′24″N 3°23′34″W	Category C(S)	40359	Upload Photo
138, 140 And 142 (Formerly 14) Whitehouse Loan, Clinton House Including Conservatory, Lodge (136 Whitehouse Loan) Gatepiers And Boundary Walls				55°55′58″N 3°12′06″W	Category B	30671	Upload Photo
2 South Lauder Road, Masson Hall, Including Gates And_Boundary Walls				55°55′55″N 3°11′00″W	Category B	30680	Upload Photo
7-9 (Odd Nos) Spottiswoode Street				55°56′20″N 3°11′54″W	Category B	30596	Upload Photo
5-11 (Incl Nos) Strathearn Place And 132 (Formerly 12) Whitehouse Loan				55°56′00″N 3°12′04″W	Category B	30602	Upload Photo
23-27 (Odd Nos) Warrender Park Road				55°56′18″N 3°11′37″W	Category B	30615	Upload another image
71-77 (Odd Nos) Warrender Park Rd 16-20 Spottiswoode Street				55°56′19″N 3°11′51″W	Category B	30627	Upload Photo
107-111 (Odd Nos) Warrender Park Road				55°56′18″N 3°11′58″W	Category B	30632	Upload Photo
117-119 (Odd Nos) Warrender Park Rd & 5 Marchmont Street				55°56′17″N 3°12′00″W	Category B	30634	Upload Photo
123 And 125 Warrender Park Road				55°56′16″N 3°12′03″W	Category B	30635	Upload Photo
38 And 39 Warrender Park Terrace				55°56′20″N 3°12′00″W	Category C(S)	30659	Upload Photo
42-43 Warrender Park Terrace And 14-15 Marchmont Street				55°56′19″N 3°12′01″W	Category B	30661	Upload Photo
12-15 (Inclusive Nos) Glenisla Gardens				55°55′38″N 3°11′23″W	Category B	30504	Upload Photo
129 Grange Loan				55°55′51″N 3°11′37″W	Category B	30509	Upload Photo
12 And 14 Greenhill Gardens				55°56′07″N 3°12′19″W	Category B	30515	Upload Photo
18 Greenhill Gardens Incl Gates Gatepiers & Boundary Walls				55°56′06″N 3°12′19″W	Category C(S)	30517	Upload Photo
32-34 (Even Nos) Greenhill Gardens				55°56′01″N 3°12′17″W	Category B	30519	Upload Photo
42 Greenhill Gardens St Bennets Incl Gatepiers And Boundary Walls				55°55′57″N 3°12′17″W	Category B	30520	Upload Photo
33 Marchmont Crescent				55°56′16″N 3°11′37″W	Category B	30533	Upload Photo
37 And 39 Marchmont Crescent				55°56′15″N 3°11′37″W	Category B	30535	Upload Photo
1-9 (Odd Nos) Marchmont Rd & 1 Marchmont Crescent				55°56′22″N 3°11′41″W	Category B	30539	Upload Photo
43-47 (Odd Nos) Marchmont Road				55°56′16″N 3°11′40″W	Category B	30546	Upload Photo
58-62 (Even Nos) Marchmont Road				55°56′15″N 3°11′42″W	Category B	30561	Upload Photo
136-144 (Even Nos) Marchmont Road				55°56′06″N 3°11′40″W	Category B	30567	Upload Photo
1 Marchmont Street				55°56′17″N 3°12′03″W	Category B	30568	Upload Photo
4 Marchmont Street				55°56′19″N 3°12′04″W	Category B	30571	Upload Photo
31 Mortonhall Rd With Boundary Walls Gates Gatepiers & Railings				55°55′38″N 3°11′39″W	Category A	30577	Upload Photo
25 (Formerly No 5) Oswald Rd Including Boundary Walls				55°55′42″N 3°11′36″W	Category C(S)	30586	Upload Photo
11-21 Millerfield Place				55°56′20″N 3°11′18″W	Category B	30455	Upload Photo
1 And 3 Palmerston Road				55°56′12″N 3°11′31″W	Category B	30456	Upload Photo
10 Palmerston Road Including Boundary Walls And Gatepiers				55°56′08″N 3°11′31″W	Category C(S)	30460	Upload Photo
1-3 (Inclusive Nos) Rillbank Crescent				55°56′21″N 3°11′23″W	Category B	30461	Upload Photo
8-10 (Inclusive Nos) Sciennes Gardens				55°56′14″N 3°11′02″W	Category C(S)	30473	Upload Photo
40 Sciennes				55°56′17″N 3°10′56″W	Category C(S)	30474	Upload Photo
18 Warrender Park Road				55°56′17″N 3°11′32″W	Category B	30489	Upload another image
2 Alvanley Terrace				55°56′15″N 3°12′10″W	Category B	30493	Upload Photo
3 And 4 Alvanley Terrace Links Hotel And Park Hotel				55°56′16″N 3°12′10″W	Category B	30494	Upload Photo
3 And 5 Clinton Road, East Morningside House Including Dovecot, Gatepiers, Garden And Boundary Walls				55°55′58″N 3°12′11″W	Category A	30499	Upload Photo
1-5 Glenisla Gardens				55°55′39″N 3°11′18″W	Category B	30502	Upload another image
54 Fountainhall Road Including Boundary Walls And Gatepiers				55°55′53″N 3°10′59″W	Category B	30377	Upload Photo
57 And 59 Grange Road Including Boundary Walls				55°56′09″N 3°11′23″W	Category C(S)	30392	Upload Photo
28 Mansionhouse Road				55°56′05″N 3°11′17″W	Category B	30431	Upload Photo
44-48 (Even Nos) Marchmont Crescent				55°56′15″N 3°11′34″W	Category B	30434	Upload another image
1 Lauriston Place, Edinburgh Royal Infirmary, Main Block, Including Linked Original Ward Pavilions				55°56′40″N 3°11′34″W	Category A	30306	Upload another image
1 Lauriston Place, Royal Infirmary, Former Nurses Home With Linking Conservatory And Fountain				55°56′38″N 3°11′36″W	Category B	30309	Upload Photo
4 And 5 Argyle Park Terrace				55°56′22″N 3°11′32″W	Category B	30332	Upload Photo
2 And 3 Argyle Place				55°56′21″N 3°11′28″W	Category C(S)	30333	Upload Photo
6 And 7 Argyle Place				55°56′20″N 3°11′28″W	Category C(S)	30335	Upload Photo
2-6 (Inclusive Nos) Beaufort Road				55°56′06″N 3°11′36″W	Category B	30342	Upload another image
26, 26A, 28 And 30 Fountainhall Road				55°55′57″N 3°10′49″W	Category C(S)	30376	Upload Photo
Grassmarket, Police Box				55°56′52″N 3°11′40″W	Category B	30235	Upload Photo
Lawnmarket, South Side, Police Box				55°56′58″N 3°11′35″W	Category B	30236	Upload another image
Hunter Square, Police Box				55°57′00″N 3°11′17″W	Category B	30237	Upload Photo
Rutland Square, Police Box				55°56′56″N 3°12′32″W	Category B	30246	Upload Photo
High Street, Group Of K6 Telephone Kiosks (At 150-164 High Street)				55°57′00″N 3°11′21″W	Category B	30254	Upload Photo
Cammo Road, Cammo Estate, Rubble Bridge				55°57′35″N 3°19′08″W	Category B	30263	Upload Photo
31 Salisbury Road, Former Longmore Hospital, Nurses' Home				55°56′17″N 3°10′35″W	Category B	30274	Upload Photo
118-144 (Even Nos, Excluding No 120) Lothian Road, And 1 And 7 Morrison St, Lothian House				55°56′42″N 3°12′20″W	Category B	30289	Upload another image
165 Broughton Road, Powderhall Refuse Depot				55°58′01″N 3°11′20″W	Category B	30290	Upload Photo
11 Easter Belmont Road, 'Lismhor'				55°56′50″N 3°15′22″W	Category B	30295	Upload Photo
3 West Silvermills Lane, Silvermills House				55°57′34″N 3°12′18″W	Category B	30302	Upload Photo
60 Princes Street				55°57′10″N 3°11′42″W	Category B	30145	Upload another image
109,110 And 111 Princes Street				55°57′06″N 3°12′07″W	Category B	30147	Upload Photo
9, 10, 11 Queensferry Street				55°57′02″N 3°12′34″W	Category B	30150	Upload Photo
1-7 (Inclusive Nos) Roseburn Cliff				55°56′47″N 3°14′01″W	Category C(S)	30154	Upload Photo
10 Russell Place, With Boundary Wall				55°58′37″N 3°12′16″W	Category B	30155	Upload Photo
12-20 (Even Nos) St Giles Street				55°57′00″N 3°11′31″W	Category B	30162	Upload Photo
St Leonard Street 64, The Coalyard House, Formerly Called Hermits And Termits				55°56′32″N 3°10′43″W	Category B	30164	Upload Photo
3-11 (Odd Nos) St Mary's Street				55°57′02″N 3°11′03″W	Category B	30165	Upload another image
2 St Mary's Street And 274-278 (Even Nos) Canongate				55°57′02″N 3°11′02″W	Category B	30166	Upload another image
4-28 (Even Nos) St Mary's Street				55°57′00″N 3°11′01″W	Category B	30167	Upload Photo
25 And 27 Shandwick Place, The Maitland Hotel				55°56′59″N 3°12′32″W	Category C(S)	30176	Upload Photo
97-101 (Odd Nos) Shandwick Place				55°56′56″N 3°12′38″W	Category B	30179	Upload Photo
Shandwick Place 2, 4 And 1-4 (Consecutive Numbers) Quensferry Street, Including H P Mathers Bar				55°57′01″N 3°12′31″W	Category B	30180	Upload Photo
Summer Place, 6-8 And 1, 2 Inverleith Terrace				55°57′51″N 3°12′08″W	Category B	30186	Upload Photo
54-60 (Even Nos) West Port And 1-12 (Inclusive Nos) Aitchison's Close Including Garden Walls And Railings				55°56′47″N 3°11′59″W	Category C(S)	30194	Upload Photo
1 Frogston Road West, Fairmilehead Parish Church (Church Of Scotland)				55°54′06″N 3°12′13″W	Category B	30210	Upload Photo
60 The Pleasance, University Of Edinburgh Societies' Centre				55°56′51″N 3°10′55″W	Category B	30051	Upload Photo
32 Hailes Avenue, Hailes House				55°54′44″N 3°15′47″W	Category B	30058	Upload Photo
42-48A (Even Nos) Broughton Street, And 2, 4 Barony Street, Including Railings				55°57′30″N 3°11′24″W	Category A	30071	Upload Photo
47-53 (Odd Nos) Cockburn Street				55°57′03″N 3°11′22″W	Category B	30082	Upload Photo
36-40 (Even Nos) Cockburn Street				55°57′02″N 3°11′21″W	Category B	30090	Upload another image
Lauriston Place, Fire Station, Including Ancillary Building, Boundary Wall, Gatepiers And Railings				55°56′44″N 3°11′59″W	Category A	30123	Upload another image
46 Lauriston Street				55°56′42″N 3°12′03″W	Category B	30129	Upload Photo
55 Lothian Street, Jericho House, Including Railings And Gate				55°56′46″N 3°11′23″W	Category B	30138	Upload another image
10 And 10A York Place, Including Railings				55°57′22″N 3°11′32″W	Category A	29978	Upload Photo
1-5 (Odd Nos) Young Street And 38 Young Street Lane North				55°57′11″N 3°12′17″W	Category B	29999	Upload Photo
17 Young Street And 22 Young Street Lane North				55°57′11″N 3°12′21″W	Category A	30002	Upload Photo
22 Young Street And 12 Young Street Lane South				55°57′10″N 3°12′22″W	Category A	30008	Upload Photo
The Pleasance, University Of Edinburgh, Former Quaker Meeting House				55°56′51″N 3°10′54″W	Category B	30014	Upload Photo
Stockbridge Church (Excluding Halls) Deanhaugh Street				55°57′31″N 3°12′36″W	Category B	30019	Upload Photo
Odeon Cinema 7 Clerk Street				55°56′33″N 3°11′00″W	Category B	30028	Upload another image
North Bridge				55°57′06″N 3°11′17″W	Category A	30035	Upload another image
Stock Bridge, With Retaining Walls And Railings On Hamilton Place				55°57′29″N 3°12′32″W	Category B	30036	Upload Photo
Preston Street School East Preston Street And Dalkeith Road				55°56′23″N 3°10′35″W	Category B	30047	Upload Photo
Whitehill Street 2-12 Newcraighall				55°56′07″N 3°05′27″W	Category C(S)	29912	Upload Photo
20 Duddingston Mills, Outbuildings And Boundary Walls				55°56′47″N 3°08′05″W	Category C(S)	29939	Upload Photo
34-38 (Even Nos) Montgomery Street And 31 Windsor Street Including Railings				55°57′33″N 3°10′52″W	Category B	29943	Upload Photo
11 And 13 Woodhall Road, With Boundary Wall				55°54′24″N 3°15′24″W	Category B	29947	Upload Photo
1-3C (Odd Nos) York Place, And 15-19 (Inclusive Nos) North St Andrew Street, Including Railings				55°57′20″N 3°11′33″W	Category A	29958	Upload Photo
5, 5A York Place, Including Railings				55°57′21″N 3°11′32″W	Category A	29959	Upload Photo
21 York Place, And 38 Elder Street, Including Railings And Lamps				55°57′21″N 3°11′27″W	Category A	29963	Upload Photo
33-37 (Odd Nos) York Place, Including Railings				55°57′22″N 3°11′23″W	Category A	29966	Upload Photo
39-43 (Odd Nos) York Place, Including Railings				55°57′22″N 3°11′22″W	Category A	29967	Upload Photo
113-118 (Consecutive Nos) Lower Granton Road				55°58′48″N 3°13′02″W	Category C(S)	29887	Upload Photo
1A, 1, 1B, 2, 3 Wardie Steps				55°58′47″N 3°12′59″W	Category C(S)	29891	Upload Photo
Dean Path And Damside, 1-54 Well Court Including Woodbarn Hall And Clock Tower				55°57′08″N 3°13′04″W	Category A	29900	Upload another image
11, 13, 15 Stafford Street, 33, 35 Alva Street				55°56′59″N 3°12′40″W	Category B	29828	Upload Photo
17-29 (Odd Numbers) Stafford Street, 34, 36 Alva Street				55°57′01″N 3°12′42″W	Category B	29829	Upload Photo
66-68 (Even Nos) Thistle Street				55°57′13″N 3°12′00″W	Category B	29845	Upload Photo
72-76 (Even Nos) Thistle Street				55°57′13″N 3°12′01″W	Category B	29846	Upload Photo
20-25 (Inclusive Nos) Union Place And 2 Union Street				55°57′27″N 3°11′08″W	Category B	29861	Upload Photo
5 And 5A Union Street Including Railings And Boundary Wall				55°57′28″N 3°11′08″W	Category B	29862	Upload Photo
1 And 3 Victoria Street				55°56′54″N 3°11′39″W	Category C(S)	29869	Upload Photo
5 And 7 Victoria Street				55°56′55″N 3°11′38″W	Category C(S)	29870	Upload Photo
22, 24, 26, 28 Walker Street				55°57′00″N 3°12′54″W	Category A	29883	Upload Photo
12-14A (Even Nos) Scotland Street, And 12B Scotland Street Lane With 11 West Scotland Street Lane				55°57′35″N 3°11′43″W	Category B	29781	Upload Photo
4-6 (Inclusive Nos) South Bridge And 5-7 (Inclusive Nos) Niddry Street				55°57′00″N 3°11′14″W	Category C(S)	29788	Upload Photo
53-67 (Inclusive Nos) South Bridge And 1 Drummond Street				55°56′52″N 3°11′10″W	Category B	29795	Upload another image
St Patrick Square 1-11				55°56′36″N 3°10′59″W	Category B	29733	Upload Photo
St Patrick Street 3, 4 And 5				55°56′37″N 3°11′01″W	Category C(S)	29740	Upload Photo
St Stephen Street 41-61				55°57′29″N 3°12′23″W	Category B	29746	Upload Photo
22-104 (Even Nos) St Stephen Street, Including Railings And Lamp				55°57′28″N 3°12′22″W	Category B	29748	Upload Photo
10-14 (Even Nos) St Vincent Street, And 81 Cumberland Street, Including Railings				55°57′29″N 3°12′10″W	Category B	29751	Upload Photo
16-18A (Even Nos) St Vincent Street, And 72 And 72A Cumberland Street, Including Railings				55°57′30″N 3°12′11″W	Category B	29752	Upload Photo
15 And 17 Salisbury Road, Including Boundary Walls, Gatepiers, And Carriage Gate				55°56′18″N 3°10′29″W	Category B	29753	Upload Photo
Saxe Coburg Street 1, 2 And 72-76 Henderson Row				55°57′36″N 3°12′22″W	Category B	29768	Upload Photo
5-9A (Odd Nos) Scotland Street, Including Railings				55°57′34″N 3°11′40″W	Category B	29772	Upload Photo
11 And 13 Scotland Street, Including Railings				55°57′35″N 3°11′41″W	Category B	29773	Upload Photo
4-7 (Inclusive Numbers) Rustic Cottages With Boundary Wall And Gates				55°54′28″N 3°15′12″W	Category B	29684	Upload Photo
23-29 (Inclusive Nos) Rutland Square, Including Railings And Lamp Standards				55°56′56″N 3°12′35″W	Category A	29690	Upload another image
32 Rutland Square And 27 Rutland Street, Including Railings And Lamp Standards				55°56′57″N 3°12′32″W	Category A	29692	Upload another image
22-26 (Even Nos) Rutland Street, Including Railings And Lamp Standards				55°56′57″N 3°12′29″W	Category B	29694	Upload another image
12, 12A And 13 St Andrew Square, Guardian Royal Exchange				55°57′13″N 3°11′40″W	Category A	29697	Upload Photo
21 And 22 St Andrew Square And 1-5 (Odd Nos) North St David Street With Railings, IBM Ltd				55°57′18″N 3°11′40″W	Category A	29698	Upload Photo
37 St Andrew Square, Bank Of Scotland, With Railings And Lamp Standards				55°57′15″N 3°11′29″W	Category A	29706	Upload Photo
St Bernard's Crescent 12 And 12A And 25-27 Danube Street				55°57′26″N 3°12′44″W	Category B	29715	Upload Photo
St. Bernard's Row 8-16				55°57′34″N 3°12′38″W	Category B	29720	Upload Photo

== Key ==
The scheme for classifying buildings in Scotland is:

- Category A: "buildings of national or international importance, either architectural or historic; or fine, little-altered examples of some particular period, style or building type."
- Category B: "buildings of regional or more than local importance; or major examples of some particular period, style or building type, which may have been altered."
- Category C: "buildings of local importance; lesser examples of any period, style, or building type, as originally constructed or moderately altered; and simple traditional buildings which group well with other listed buildings."

In March 2016 there were 47,288 listed buildings in Scotland. Of these, 8% were Category A, and 50% were Category B, with the remaining 42% being Category C.

== See also ==
- List of listed buildings in Edinburgh
