= List of listed buildings in Edinburgh/30 =

This is a list of listed buildings in Edinburgh, Scotland.

== List ==
Name	Location	Date Listed	Grid Ref. (Note: Sometimes known as OSGB36, the grid reference (where provided) is based on the British national grid reference system used by the Ordnance Survey. • "Guide to National Grid". Ordnance Survey. • "Get-a-map". Ordnance Survey.)	Geo-coordinates	Notes	LB Number (Note: Historic Environment Scotland assign a unique alphanumeric identifier to each designated site in Scotland, for listed buildings this always begins with "LB", for example "LB12345".)	Image
Orwell Place, Dalry House With Railings And Lamp Standards				55°56′35″N 3°13′08″W	Category B	26962	Upload Photo
33 Barony Street, Glasite Meeting House				55°57′28″N 3°11′30″W	Category A	26973	Upload another image
44 Bernard Street				55°58′34″N 3°10′07″W	Category B	26982	Upload Photo
20 Bellfield Street				55°57′09″N 3°06′29″W	Category C(S)	26992	Upload Photo
14 Ladycroft				55°53′03″N 3°20′18″W	Category C(S)	27003	Upload Photo
1 Church Hill, Westgate, With Boundary Walls				55°55′57″N 3°12′31″W	Category B	27006	Upload Photo
Gorgie Road, Gorgie Parish Church (Formerly Up)				55°56′17″N 3°13′59″W	Category B	26863	Upload Photo
18 Colinton Road				55°55′56″N 3°12′57″W	Category C(S)	26867	Upload Photo
Glenbrook Road, Bankhead House With Walled Garden, Bridge Gates And Railings				55°52′52″N 3°21′20″W	Category B	26869	Upload Photo
Dock Street (Formerly In Johnstone Street), East Gate Of Leith Citadel				55°58′37″N 3°10′29″W	Category B	26902	Upload Photo
44 Harlaw Road, The Glen, Malleny Mill With Mill Lade And Boundary Wall				55°52′36″N 3°19′31″W	Category C(S)	26907	Upload Photo
60-66 Bath Street, 25 The Promenade				55°57′17″N 3°06′39″W	Category B	26908	Upload Photo
24 Canaan Lane, Goshen Bank Or Goshen House				55°55′39″N 3°12′26″W	Category C(S)	26911	Upload Photo
Duddingston Parish Church, Loupin-On-Stane, Old Church Lane, Duddingston				55°56′29″N 3°08′55″W	Category B	26925	Upload Photo
7 Brunstane Road North, Hamilton Lodge Hotel Including Gatepiers And Boundary Walls				55°57′04″N 3°06′07″W	Category B	26802	Upload Photo
18 Brunstane Road North, (Rabbit Hall) Including Boundary Walls				55°57′03″N 3°06′04″W	Category B	26814	Upload Photo
5 Elcho Terrace				55°57′06″N 3°06′19″W	Category C(S)	26840	Upload Photo
Bonnington Sundial				55°54′24″N 3°25′25″W	Category A	26853	Upload Photo
2 James Street With Boundary Walls				55°57′02″N 3°06′14″W	Category C(S)	26854	Upload Photo
8 And 10 Colinton Road Napier House With Boundary Walls And Gatepiers				55°56′01″N 3°12′44″W	Category B	26855	Upload Photo
13, 14 Gladstone Place With Boundary Wall				55°58′11″N 3°09′31″W	Category C(S)	26856	Upload Photo
39-47 (Odd Nos) Bernard Street				55°58′33″N 3°10′09″W	Category B	26860	Upload Photo
Queensferry Road, Buckingham Terrace And 66 Dean Path, Bristo Baptist Church				55°57′17″N 3°13′17″W	Category B	26758	Upload Photo
76 Coburg Street, T And Jw Neilson Ltd (Former Stables); Eh6 6Hj				55°58′33″N 3°10′43″W	Category C(S)	26760	Upload Photo
198-206 Even Nos Bruntsfield Place And 1 And 3 Montpelier Park				55°56′09″N 3°12′36″W	Category B	26763	Upload Photo
George Iv Bridge And 11A And 11C Merchant Street, Augustine United Free Church (United Reformed Church)				55°56′52″N 3°11′28″W	Category B	26707	Upload Photo
14 Abercorn Terrace St Philip's Parish Church, Including Boundary Walls And Lamp Standards				55°57′01″N 3°06′10″W	Category B	26724	Upload Photo
6 Claremont Park, Claremont Park Nursing Home With Boundary Wall, Gatepiers And Lamp Brackets				55°58′11″N 3°09′23″W	Category B	26739	Upload Photo
Addistoun Dovecot				55°54′42″N 3°21′17″W	Category A	26697	Upload another image See more images
Dalmeny Village, 3 Easter Dalmeny				55°58′57″N 3°22′22″W	Category B	5529	Upload Photo
Dalmeny Village, 9 Main Street, Including Workshop				55°58′54″N 3°22′25″W	Category C(S)	5537	Upload Photo
Dalmeny Village, 9A Main Street, Post Office				55°58′54″N 3°22′25″W	Category C(S)	5538	Upload Photo
Dalmeny Village, 5 Wester Dalmeny Farmhouse, Including Gate, Gatepiers And Boundary Walls				55°58′57″N 3°22′37″W	Category B	5546	Upload Photo
Craigiehall, Stable Court, Including Walls And Gatepiers				55°57′58″N 3°20′11″W	Category B	5561	Upload Photo
Dalmeny House, Home Farm, Including Gatepiers				55°58′52″N 3°19′50″W	Category C(S)	5499	Upload Photo
Dalmeny House, Edinburgh Gate Lodge, Including Gatepiers				55°58′10″N 3°19′24″W	Category B	5505	Upload Photo
Dundas Castle, Ice House				55°58′19″N 3°25′08″W	Category B	5516	Upload Photo
4 Marine Drive And 11 West Shore Road, Granton Gasworks No 1 Gasholder				55°58′49″N 3°14′41″W	Category B	45793	Upload Photo
22 Frogston Road West, Including Garage				55°53′59″N 3°11′59″W	Category C(S)	45838	Upload Photo
12 Swanston Village				55°53′32″N 3°13′02″W	Category B	45847	Upload another image
15 Swanston Village				55°53′33″N 3°13′00″W	Category C(S)	45849	Upload Photo
105-109 (Odd Nos) Broughton Street				55°57′32″N 3°11′24″W	Category C(S)	45934	Upload Photo
9 Randolph Place				55°57′06″N 3°12′36″W	Category B	46123	Upload another image
63 Bonaly Road, Druim With, Gates And Garden Terrace				55°53′52″N 3°15′22″W	Category B	46286	Upload Photo
East Trinity Road, Railway Tunnel				55°58′34″N 3°12′12″W	Category B	46729	Upload Photo
Harewood Road, Craigmillar Primary School				55°56′07″N 3°07′53″W	Category B	46973	Upload Photo
21-35 (Odd Nos) Lauriston Place Including Boundary Walls And Railings				55°56′41″N 3°11′44″W	Category B	47034	Upload another image
Fair-A-Far Weir, And Mill Remains				55°58′26″N 3°18′30″W	Category B	47281	Upload Photo
19 George Square				55°56′37″N 3°11′26″W	Category A	47583	Upload another image
183, 185 And 187 Morrison Street				55°56′46″N 3°12′48″W	Category C(S)	47726	Upload Photo
30, 31 And 32 Castle Terrace, Including Boundary Wall And Railings				55°56′49″N 3°12′09″W	Category A	47855	Upload another image
11-15 Cornwall Street, Including Boundary Wall And Railings				55°56′50″N 3°12′12″W	Category A	47858	Upload Photo
Grassmarket, Covenanters' Memorial, With Boundary Wall, Railings And Gate				55°56′52″N 3°11′41″W	Category C(S)	47867	Upload Photo
26 And 28 Lauriston Place, Including Boundary Walls, Railings And Gate				55°56′42″N 3°11′47″W	Category B	47889	Upload another image
9-15 (Odd Nos) Spittal Street				55°56′46″N 3°12′13″W	Category C(S)	47897	Upload Photo
2-10 (Even Nos) Spittal Street And 39-45 (Odd Nos) Bread Street				55°56′45″N 3°12′11″W	Category C(S)	47900	Upload Photo
6 Douglas Gardens, Belford Road, Former Belford Church				55°57′03″N 3°13′13″W	Category B	48133	Upload another image
Edinburgh Castle, Lang Stairs				55°56′56″N 3°12′00″W	Category B	48221	Upload Photo
83 London Road, Holyrood Abbey Church (Church Of Scotland)				55°57′25″N 3°10′09″W	Category B	48539	Upload Photo
Henderland Road, St George's School, Lansdowne House Including Gatehouse, Gatepiers And Boundary Wall				55°56′54″N 3°14′08″W	Category C(S)	48889	Upload Photo
23 Murrayfield Road, Redcroft, With Boundary Wall				55°56′52″N 3°14′52″W	Category C(S)	48899	Upload Photo
43 Murrayfield Road, Clubhouse, Including Boundary Wall And Gatepiers				55°57′00″N 3°15′04″W	Category C(S)	48900	Upload Photo
29-39 (Odd Numbers) Montrose Terrace				55°57′26″N 3°10′16″W	Category B	49060	Upload Photo
41-49 (Odd Numbers) Montrose Terrace				55°57′26″N 3°10′14″W	Category B	49061	Upload Photo
70 Kingston Avenue, Kingston Stables With Boundary Wall, Gatepiers And Entrance Arch				55°55′11″N 3°08′58″W	Category B	49539	Upload Photo
13 Kinnear Road, Jeffrey House With Boundary Wall And Gateposts				55°58′04″N 3°13′05″W	Category B	49543	Upload Photo
71 Bonaly Road, Lord Cockburn's Bath And "Ruined Chapel"				55°53′39″N 3°15′41″W	Category B	49549	Upload Photo
23 And 24 Bridge Road With Raised Pavement And Boundary Wall				55°54′26″N 3°15′31″W	Category C(S)	49551	Upload Photo
9 Carlton Terrace Including Railings And Boundary Walls				55°57′23″N 3°10′25″W	Category A	49751	Upload Photo
19 Carlton Terrace Including Railings And Boundary Walls				55°57′24″N 3°10′30″W	Category A	49761	Upload another image
11 Regent Terrace, Including Railings And Boundary Walls				55°57′17″N 3°10′37″W	Category A	49774	Upload another image
26 Regent Terrace, Including Railings And Boundary Walls				55°57′19″N 3°10′31″W	Category A	49791	Upload another image
27 Regent Terrace, Including Railings And Boundary Walls				55°57′19″N 3°10′31″W	Category A	49792	Upload another image
34 Regent Terrace Including Railings And Boundary Walls				55°57′21″N 3°10′28″W	Category A	49799	Upload Photo
6 Royal Terrace Including Railings And Boundary Walls				55°57′24″N 3°10′49″W	Category A	49804	Upload Photo
25 Royal Terrace Including Railings And Boundary Walls				55°57′24″N 3°10′40″W	Category A	49816	Upload another image
30 Royal Terrace Including Railings And Boundary Walls				55°57′24″N 3°10′37″W	Category A	49821	Upload Photo
35 Royal Terrace Including Railings And Boundary Walls				55°57′24″N 3°10′34″W	Category A	49827	Upload another image
38 Royal Terrace Including Railings And Boundary Walls				55°57′24″N 3°10′32″W	Category A	49830	Upload another image
14 And 16 Holyrood Road				55°56′57″N 3°10′57″W	Category C(S)	50148	Upload Photo
Charterhall Road, Police Box				55°55′34″N 3°11′34″W	Category B	50880	Upload Photo
70 Belford Road, Former Dean Cemetery Gate Lodge, Including Boundary Walls And Gates				55°57′03″N 3°13′22″W	Category C(S)	51393	Upload another image
South Trinity Road, Lamp Standard				55°58′17″N 3°12′28″W	Category B	51550	Upload Photo
496 Ferry Road, Former Wardieburn House				55°58′12″N 3°13′32″W	Category C(S)	45650	Upload Photo
1 Lufra Bank, Off Granton View, Lufra House Including Boundary Wall				55°58′44″N 3°13′06″W	Category C(S)	45657	Upload Photo
Queen Street Gardens, Railings And Gates				55°57′19″N 3°12′01″W	Category B	45519	Upload another image
Gilmore Park And Fountainbridge, Former North British Rubber Company Ltd				55°56′32″N 3°12′46″W	Category C(S)	44936	Upload Photo
134 Corstorphine Road, Edinburgh Zoo (Royal Zoological Society Of Scotland) Lodge, Gates And Gatepiers				55°56′32″N 3°16′10″W	Category B	44749	Upload another image
East Suffolk Road, St Margaret's School (Former Craigmillar Park Free Church), Including Gatepiers And Boundary Walls				55°55′48″N 3°10′05″W	Category B	44214	Upload Photo
21 Hallhead Road, Rankine House, Including Gates, Gatepiers And Boundary Walls				55°55′25″N 3°10′15″W	Category B	44223	Upload Photo
1 Mayfield Terrace, Including Boundary Walls				55°56′06″N 3°10′22″W	Category C(S)	44231	Upload Photo
12 And 12A Grove Street, Including Railings				55°56′44″N 3°12′47″W	Category B	44037	Upload Photo
2 Inveralmond Drive				55°58′13″N 3°18′29″W	Category C(S)	43940	Upload Photo
13 And 15 Park Road, Newhaven, Including Boundary Wall				55°58′45″N 3°11′42″W	Category C(S)	43719	Upload Photo
15 Hill Street				55°57′13″N 3°12′10″W	Category A	43298	Upload Photo
36 North West Thistle Street Lane				55°57′15″N 3°12′02″W	Category C(S)	43311	Upload Photo
76 And 77 Princes Street And 1 Hanover Street				55°57′08″N 3°11′47″W	Category B	43319	Upload Photo
Rose Street, Charlotte Street Baptist Chapel				55°57′04″N 3°12′20″W	Category B	43329	Upload Photo
162 Rose Street				55°57′06″N 3°12′09″W	Category C(S)	43339	Upload Photo
194 Rose Street				55°57′05″N 3°12′17″W	Category B	43343	Upload Photo
131 And 133 Rose Street South Lane				55°57′04″N 3°12′15″W	Category C(S)	43347	Upload Photo
9 And 10 St Andrew Square				55°57′12″N 3°11′39″W	Category A	43349	Upload Photo
47A And 49 Thistle Street And 21 North West Thistle Street Lane				55°57′15″N 3°11′58″W	Category B	43359	Upload Photo
59 And 61 Thistle Street				55°57′14″N 3°12′00″W	Category B	43361	Upload Photo
50-52 (Even Nos) Thistle Street				55°57′14″N 3°11′57″W	Category B	43363	Upload Photo
15 Young Street And 24 Young Street Lane North				55°57′11″N 3°12′20″W	Category A	43366	Upload Photo
Alnwickhill Road And 1-4B (Inclusive Nos) Stanedykehead, Alnwickhill House With Gatepiers And Boundary Walls				55°54′32″N 3°10′09″W	Category B	43233	Upload Photo
74 Liberton Gardens, Alnwickhill Reservoir, Former Superintendent's House With Gates And Gatepiers				55°54′21″N 3°09′57″W	Category C(S)	43247	Upload Photo
Gilmerton, 83 Drum Street				55°54′17″N 3°07′50″W	Category C(S)	43257	Upload Photo
Gilmerton, 89 Ravenscroft Street				55°54′07″N 3°08′10″W	Category C(S)	43261	Upload Photo
Newhaven Road, Victoria Park, Edward Vii Statue, Gatepiers And Quadrant Railings				55°58′31″N 3°11′27″W	Category B	43279	Upload Photo
25-29 (Odd Nos) And 29A Castle Street				55°57′08″N 3°12′11″W	Category B	43281	Upload Photo
48, 48A Frederick Street				55°57′13″N 3°12′04″W	Category B	43284	Upload Photo
297 Dalkeith Road, Including Gatepiers				55°55′51″N 3°09′46″W	Category C(S)	43150	Upload Photo
7 Upper Gray Street, St Columba's Rc Church Including Boundary Walls				55°56′12″N 3°10′43″W	Category B	43173	Upload another image
44 And 45 Water Street				55°58′28″N 3°10′11″W	Category B	43176	Upload Photo
8 High Street And 1 Gote Lane, Stag Head Hotel				55°59′26″N 3°23′49″W	Category B	40375	Upload Photo
29/1 - 29/4 And 29/7 Hopetoun Road And 5 And 6 The Loan, Plewlands House				55°59′26″N 3°23′52″W	Category A	40389	Upload another image
2 Hopetoun Road, 4 Bellstane				55°59′27″N 3°23′51″W	Category B	40390	Upload Photo
Hopetoun Road, Inchgarvie House (Flats A-L)				55°59′32″N 3°25′17″W	Category C(S)	40392	Upload Photo
1 Mid Terrace				55°59′23″N 3°23′43″W	Category B	40395	Upload Photo
1-6 (Inclusive Numbers) Mid Terrace, Wall And Railings				55°59′24″N 3°23′44″W	Category B	40399	Upload Photo
Stoneycroft Road From The Loan To Rear Of 11 East Terrace, Railway Embankment				55°59′20″N 3°23′42″W	Category C(S)	40400	Upload Photo
40 Shore Road, Flotilla Club, (Now Sheltered Accommodation)				55°59′30″N 3°24′10″W	Category B	40412	Upload Photo
10A And 10B East Terrace				55°59′22″N 3°23′37″W	Category B	40341	Upload Photo
16 East Terrace And Camperdown				55°59′23″N 3°23′40″W	Category B	40346	Upload Photo
17 East Terrace, Inchcolm (In Close To Rear Of 18 East Terrace)				55°59′22″N 3°23′41″W	Category B	40349	Upload Photo
2 Newhalls Road, Hawes Inn				55°59′25″N 3°23′06″W	Category B	40354	Upload Photo
2 And 3 Newhalls Road, The Two Bridges Hotel				55°59′23″N 3°23′15″W	Category B	40357	Upload Photo
1 And 3 Edinburgh Road				55°59′23″N 3°23′34″W	Category C(S)	40358	Upload Photo
23 Edinburgh Road, Seals Craig Hotel				55°59′24″N 3°23′32″W	Category C(S)	40362	Upload another image See more images
Forth Bridge				55°59′54″N 3°23′15″W	Category A	40370	Upload another image
27 South Oswald Road Carrington House Including Gatepiers And Gates				55°55′42″N 3°11′41″W	Category B	30591	Upload Photo
12-14 (Inclusive Nos) Warrender Park Crescent				55°56′18″N 3°12′06″W	Category B	30612	Upload Photo
61-63 (Odd Nos) Warrender Park Road				55°56′19″N 3°11′48″W	Category B	30623	Upload Photo
65 Warrender Park Road				55°56′19″N 3°11′49″W	Category B	30624	Upload Photo
141-145 (Odd Nos) Warrender Park Road				55°56′15″N 3°12′07″W	Category B	30639	Upload Photo
25-26 Warrender Park Terrace And 1 Spottiswoode Street				55°56′21″N 3°11′54″W	Category B	30653	Upload another image
33-35 (Inclusive Nos) Warrender Park Terrace				55°56′20″N 3°11′58″W	Category B	30657	Upload another image
10 Greenhill Gardens				55°56′08″N 3°12′19″W	Category B	30514	Upload Photo
43 Marchmont Crescent				55°56′14″N 3°11′38″W	Category B	30537	Upload Photo
Marchmont Rd & Marchmont Cres Napier Univ Annexe Formerly Marchmont Road School				55°56′13″N 3°11′39″W	Category B	30538	Upload another image
11 Marchmont Road				55°56′21″N 3°11′41″W	Category B	30540	Upload Photo
59 Marchmont Road				55°56′14″N 3°11′39″W	Category B	30550	Upload Photo
52-56 (Even Nos) Marchmont Road				55°56′15″N 3°11′42″W	Category B	30560	Upload Photo
9 Marchmont Street				55°56′18″N 3°12′01″W	Category B	30573	Upload Photo
23 Mortonhall Road Including Boundary Walls And Steps				55°55′39″N 3°11′31″W	Category B	30576	Upload Photo
33 Mortonhall Road With Lamp Posts Boundary Walls And Gates And Railings				55°55′38″N 3°11′40″W	Category A	30578	Upload Photo
2 Roseneath Terrace And 28-30 (Inclusive Nos) Argyle Place				55°56′19″N 3°11′30″W	Category B	30468	Upload another image
4-8 (Even Nos) Roseneath Terrace				55°56′19″N 3°11′31″W	Category B	30469	Upload another image

== Key ==
The scheme for classifying buildings in Scotland is:

- Category A: "buildings of national or international importance, either architectural or historic; or fine, little-altered examples of some particular period, style or building type."
- Category B: "buildings of regional or more than local importance; or major examples of some particular period, style or building type, which may have been altered."
- Category C: "buildings of local importance; lesser examples of any period, style, or building type, as originally constructed or moderately altered; and simple traditional buildings which group well with other listed buildings."

In March 2016 there were 47,288 listed buildings in Scotland. Of these, 8% were Category A, and 50% were Category B, with the remaining 42% being Category C.

== See also ==
- List of listed buildings in Edinburgh
