= His Majesty's Botanist =

Royal position in Scotland

His Majesty's Botanist is a member of the Royal household in Scotland.

The office was created in 1699, and from 1768 until 1956 it was combined with the office of Regius Keeper of the Royal Botanic Garden Edinburgh, who also held the post of Regius Professor of Botany at the University of Edinburgh. Since then the office of HM Botanist has been honorary, but conferred on a serving or retired Regius Keeper.

== Office holders ==
- 1699: James Sutherland
- 1715: Dr William Arthur
- 1716: Charles Alston
- 1761: DR John Hope
- 1786: Daniel Rutherford
- 1820: Robert Graham
- 1845: John Hutton Balfour
- 1880: Alexander Dickson
- 1888: Sir Isaac Bayley Balfour
- 1922: Prof. Sir William Wright Smith (d 1956)
- 1966: Harold Roy Fletcher (d 1978)
- 1987: Prof. Douglas Mackay Henderson
- 2010: Prof Stephen Blackmore

== See also ==
- Regius Keeper of the Royal Botanic Garden Edinburgh

== Sources ==
- Holders from 1703 to 1820 from "Exchequer Establishment List" c.1770 (E/229/10/1) in National Archives of Scotland
- Royal Botanic Garden: A Brief History
