= Charles Alston (disambiguation) =

Charles Alston (1907–1977) was an American artist.

Charles Alston may also refer to:

- Charles Alston (botanist) (1683–1760), Scottish botanist
- Charles Alston (gridiron football) (born 1978), American football player
- Charles Henry Alston (lawyer) (1873–?), American lawyer and civil rights leader in Tampa, Florida
