= Noel Farnie Robertson =

Scottish Botanist and Agriculturist

- Born: 24 December 1923; Dundalk, Ireland
- Died: 2 July 1999 (aged 75)
- Occupation(s): Botanist and Agriculturist
- Spouse(s): Doreen, doctor and cellist
- Children: two boys and two girls

Noel Farnie Robertson CBE FRSE (1923–1999) was a Scottish botanist and agriculturist who was elected a Fellow of the Royal Society of Edinburgh (FRSE).

== Biography ==
=== Early life ===
Robertson was born on Christmas Eve, 24 December 1923, in Dundalk, Ireland. His parents, James Robertson and Catherine Landles Brown were of Scottish Presbyterian background and returned to Scotland while Noel was still young. They lived in north Edinburgh and Noel attended Trinity Academy.

He then studied Botany at Edinburgh University which at the time was partially taught in Inverleith at the Royal Botanical Gardens. During his studies Robertson developed interests in plant pathology and fungal taxonomy, most probably inspired by the Reader in Mycology, Malcolm Wilson. He also became interested in botanic gardens and horticulture. Robertson won the Sir David Baxter Scholarship and the Turner Prize and obtained a degree with first class honours in Botany in 1944.

Robertson then went to Trinity College, Cambridge as a postgraduate, where he obtained a Diploma in Agricultural science. He later described this time as one of the happiest in his life, as he was able to work on the land, getting his hands dirty, and gained pleasure and fulfilment from hard manual labour. His time at Cambridge concluded with time at the Virus Research Station with Kenneth Smith, at Rothamsted Experimental Station with Frederick Bawden and studying tree viruses on a tour of the US. The University of Edinburgh awarded Robertson their Gunning Victoria Jubilee Prize for his report on tree viruses.

Following Cambridge, in 1946 Robertson spent a short time in Ghana working with Peter Posnette at the Cocoa Research Institute at which he studied viral swollen shoot disease in cocoa. Later he wrote this work up as a thesis, Virus diseases of trees in two continents, for which the University of Edinburgh awarded him a PhD.

=== Cambridge ===
Robertson was seen by Frederick Tom Brooks as a rising star. In 1949 Brooks asked Robertson to return to Cambridge to be a Lecturer in Mycology. At Cambridge, Robertson worked with John Rishbeth who was interested in the world of soil and Denis Garrett who was interested in cereal and tree root diseases. With a succession of outstanding students, Robertson did some of his best research. His initial studies were of the Hartig net in ectomycorrhiza associated with trees (Pinus sylvestris). In conjunction with Eric Buxton he later undertook pioneering work, unravelling of a deep understanding of the parasexual recombination and variation of Fusarium oxysporum.

Rich farmlands in the Fens took Robertson into the field to study Phytophthora infestans epidemiology and the resistance mechanisms of potatoes to Phytophthora infestans which causes potato blight. In the laboratory Robertson developed revolutionary ideas on hyphal branching and growth with simple experiments that provided many insights about basic fungal growth processes.

While in Cambridge Robertson also spent time teaching, developing a style very much his own. Students reported that they did not get comprehensive knowledge of plant pathology or of mycology, but they did get to know what scholarship was. Students got to feel the excitement of the unknown and what was involved in research on plant pathology and on mycology.

In Cambridge Robertson and his wife rented a flat in a house near the Cambridge University Botanic Garden in Brookside. Max Walters and his wife Lorna rented an adjacent flat. Robertson and Walters shared a love of horticulture and natural history and Robertson developed his thinking about the importance of botanic gardens in informing the public about, and in the teaching of, botany.

=== Hull ===
In 1959, at the age of 35, Robertson became Professor of Botany at the University of Hull. At Hull Robertson built, from the bottom up, his own Department. It embodied his breadth of vision and the then swiftly evolving disciplines of bio-chemistry, ecology, genetics, and plant pathology. To complement the existing staff Robertson attracted a group of young lecturers. Together they provided undergraduates with both modern and traditional instruction in botany.

Robertson developed the university's small botanic and experimental garden with specialist research collections, diverse collections for teaching and, to support research, experimental plots for bio-chemistry, ecology, genetics, and plant pathology. The garden was also open to the public. Robertson's 1962 article on botanic gardens published in Nature demonstrated that he "was in the vanguard of modern thinking on his subject".

As well as running his department, Robertson also undertook university other duties and beyond. He was Dean of Science and in 1964 President of the British Mycological Society. The pressures of attending to teaching, research, student welfare, the university and his profession were too much. In 1967 he had a massive heart attack. However, after being absent for many months, and with the support of his family, he was able to return to work.

During the first International Congress of Plant Pathology in 1968 Robertson received a request from the University of Edinburgh to run the Edinburgh School of Agriculture, a partnership between the University and the Edinburgh and East of Scotland College of Agriculture. The post consisted of the Chair of Agriculture and Rural Economy at the University along with being Principal of the Edinburgh and East of Scotland College of Agriculture. Robertson took a day off from the conference to discuss the issues with two ex-students while walking around Kew Gardens. He accepted the offer.

John Friend, a distinguished plant pathologist and biochemist succeeded Robertson as Hull's Professor of Biology.

=== Edinburgh ===
When Robertson moved back to Edinburgh in 1969 he took over the School of Agriculture from Sir Stephen Watson. He was elected a Fellow of the Royal Society of Edinburgh in March of that year. His proposers were James MacDonald, Harold Fletcher, Anthony Elliot Ritchie and Douglas Mackay Henderson. He served as Vice President of the Society from 1980 to 1983.

The time that Robertson was at Edinburgh was one of agricultural expansion with unprecedented levels of government funding. His new posts allowed Robertson to create an institution that catered for teaching, research and provided an advisory service. With Robertson at the helm, the Edinburgh School of Agriculture became a world leading centre for research and teaching. He endeavoured to promote both the East of Scotland College and the School of Agriculture. Despite the Department being described as being "so unwieldy as to be totally unmanageable", Robertson, who by nature was self-effacing and quiet, gave the Department purpose, drew it together and shepherded it through one of the most successful periods in its history. In the School Robertson brought about a seamless operation. College and University staff shared resources and worked together to gain international recognition for education, research and advisory work.

In addition, from 1974, Robertson was Dean of Science at the University of Edinburgh, and for 13 years was Vice-Chairman of the Edinburgh Centre for Rural Economy (which became the Edinburgh Centre for Rural Research). The latter was concerned with conservation and land use, bringing together heads and others from local university departments and research institutions. The Centre promoted co-operation, including interdisciplinary research. Robertson also represented the University on several governing bodies of research institutes, including as Chairman of Governors of the Scottish Crop Research Institute for nine years. He also chaired the Conference of University Professors of Agriculture and Horticulture.

Prior to retirement Robertson lived in the Pentland Hills south of Edinburgh, where every day he walked his dog, a border collie. Robertson retired in 1983.

=== Retirement ===
After retirement Robertson moved to Juniper Bank, near Walkerburn and the River Tweed in the Scottish Borders. Here he also walked his dog in the nearby woodlands and hills.

In his retirement Robertson devoted himself to a number of projects. He started in Pakistan where for six months he helped write an agricultural research plan for that country. On his return he drew on his management experience and knowledge of horticulture and botanic gardens to be an active Trustee of the Royal Botanic Garden Edinburgh, furthering its teaching and research. As Vice-Chairman and founder Committee member of the Garden's Friends' organisation, Robertson also promoted the Botanic Garden as place for the general public to enjoy.

Robertson hired machines and rented land from a neighbour and built up stocks of selected narcissi. While his farm was not very profitable, Robertson had the satisfaction of having set up a successful business. Drawing on advice from staff at the Royal Botanic Garden Edinburgh, Robertson also advised a friend on planting, especially of rhododendrons, in his large garden of Ellibank.

=== Death ===
Robertson died on 2 July 1999. His funeral was held at Walkerburn parish church. Despite many botanists and agriculturists being present, his funeral was a family occasion. Robertson had requested that the minister say little about his academic work.

== Family ==
In 1948 Robertson married Doreen Colina Gardner, a doctor and cellist. They had known each other since they were at school. They had four children, two boys and two girls.

== Published works ==
With Ian Fleming, Robertson wrote a history of the chair that he had held for many years, Britain's first chair of Agriculture which was established in 1790. Britain's First Chair of Agriculture at the University of Edinburgh, 1790-1990 was published in 1990.

In 1995 Robertson's book on food production (From Dearth to Plenty: The Modern Revolution in Food Production) was published by the Cambridge University Press. One chapter had been written by Sir Kenneth Blaxter before his death. Although Robertson wrote the rest of the book, with characteristic modesty, he placed Blaxter's name first on the title page.

With David Ingram, Robertson wrote Plant Disease: A Natural History, which was published by HarperCollins in their New Naturalist series in 1999.

See also Bibliography.

== Awards ==
In 1969 Robertson was elected a Fellow of the Royal Society of Edinburgh (FRSE).

In 1979 Robertson was appointed a Commander of the Order of the British Empire (CBE).

== Bibliography ==
- Blaxter, K. L., and Noel F. Robertson. From Dearth to Plenty: The Modern Revolution in Food Production. Cambridge: Cambridge UP, 1995. Print.
- Fleming, Ian J., and Noel F. Robertson. Britain's First Chair of Agriculture at the University of Edinburgh, 1790-1990. Edinburgh: East of Scotland College of Agriculture, 1990. Print.
- Ingram, D. S., and N. F. Robertson. "Interaction between Phytophthora Infestans and Tissue Cultures of Solanum Tuberosum." Microbiology 40.3 (1965): 431-37. Print.
- Ingram, David S., and Noel F. Robertson. Plant Disease: A Natural History. London: HarperCollins, 1999. Print. New Naturalist Ser. No. 85.
- Robertson, Noel F. "Studies on the Mycorrhiza of Pinus Sylvestris I. The Pattern of Development of Mycorrhizal Roots and Its Significance for Experimental Studies." 'New Phytologist. 53 (1954): 253-83. Print.
- Robertson, Noël Farnie. The Reason for Studying Plant Diseases; an Inaugural Lecture Delivered in the University of Hull on 10 February 1960. Hull: U of Hull, 1960. Print.
- Robertson, Noel F. "The Botanic Garden and Its Functions." Nature 194 (1962): 11-13. Print.
- Robertson, Noel F. "The Fungal Hypha." Transactions of the British Mycological Society. 48 (1965): 1-8. Print.
- Robertson, N. F. "The Growth Process in Fungi." Annual Review of Phytopathology. 6.1 (1968): 115-36. Print.
- Robertson, N. F., J. Friend, M. Aveyard, J. Brown, M. Huffee, and A. L. Homans. "The Accumulation of Phenolic Acids in Tissue Culture-pathogen Combinations of Solanum Tuberosum and Phyto-phthora Infestans." Journal of General Microbiology 54 (1968): 261-68. Print.
- Wilson, M., and N. F. Robertson. "The Biology, Culture, Morphology, and Relationship of Lophodermium Vagulum Sp. Nov.; the Cause of a Disease of Chinese Rhododendrons." Transactions of the Royal Society of Edinburgh. 61 (1947): 517-31. Print.

The standard author abbreviation N.F.Robertson is used to indicate this person as the author when citing a botanical name.
