= Aria eystettensis =

- Aria eystettensis growing in the Altmühl valley in Bavaria, Germany

Conservation status
- Critically Endangered (IUCN 3.1)

Scientific classification
- Kingdom: Plantae
- Clade: Tracheophytes
- Clade: Angiosperms
- Clade: Eudicots
- Clade: Rosids
- Order: Rosales
- Family: Rosaceae
- Genus: Aria
- Species: A. eystettensis

Binomial name
- Aria eystettensis (N.Mey.) Mosyakin, Fedor. & McNeill
- It is endemic to Bavaria, Germany

Synonyms
- Karpatiosorbus eystettensis (N.Mey.) Sennikov & Kurtto; Pyrus eystettensis (N.Mey.) M.F.Fay & Christenh.; Sorbus eystettensis N.Mey.

Species of tree

Aria eystettensis, the Eichstaett whitebeam, is an apomictic species of tree in the family Rosaceae endemic to Bavaria, Germany It is extremely rare and threatened with extinction.

== Description ==
Aria eystettensis foliage

Aria eystettensis fruits

=== Vegetative characteristics ===
Aria eystettensis is an up to 6–10 m tall tree or shrub. The short twigs bear ovate to rounded, 6–7 cm long leaves with lobed margins and 8–10 pairs of lateral veins, which are set 5 mm apart. The long twigs bear larger, 10–12 cm long leaves with 10–11 pairs of lateral veins, which are set 10–14 mm apart.

=== Generative characteristics ===
The flat-topped inflorescence bears flowers with 2 basally fused styles. The dark orange, oval, 10 mm long accessory fruit bears small, densely packed, 0.2–0.4 mm big lenticels.

=== Cytology ===
The chromosome count is 2n = 3x = 51.

== Taxonomy ==
It was first described as Sorbus eystettensis N.Mey. by Norbert Meyer in 2005. It was moved to the genus Aria (Pers.) J.Jacq. ex Host as Aria eystettensis (N.Mey.) Mosyakin, Fedor. & McNeill by Sergei Leonidovich Mosyakin, Mykola Mykhaylovych Fedoronchuk, and John McNeill in 2025. The type specimen was collected on the 18th of June 2001 by H. Schuwerk and O. Angerer at the Frauenberg in Eichstätt, Germany.

=== Etymology ===
The specific epithet eystettensis refers to Eichstätt in Bavaria, Germany.

== Distribution and habitat ==
It is endemic to Bavaria, Germany, where it occurs in a small area of only 12 km^{2} in open pine forest, on the edges of deciduous forest, and in grazed grassland at elevations of 400–510 m above sea level.

== Conservation ==
It is a critically endangered species with a restricted distribution and a small population of only 30 mature trees. The habitat is managed to increase the available light for Aria eystettensis trees. It doesn't have special legal protection. It is cultivated in one ex situ conservation collection.
