= Regius Keeper of the Royal Botanic Garden Edinburgh =

Formal position

The Royal status of the Royal Botanic Garden Edinburgh (RBGE) is intrinsically linked to the issue of a Royal Warrant to the first Intendant of the Gardens in 1699. Since that date, the appointment of each new Director of RBGE has required the assent of the reigning monarch of the United Kingdom, the appointee receiving the unique title Regius (that is, royal) Keeper.

Just 29 years after the original Physic Garden was founded, by Dr (later Sir) Robert Sibbald and Dr (later Sir) Andrew Balfour, their appointed Garden overseer - James Sutherland - was rewarded for his diverse contributions: to the care of the gardens, to medical and botanical teaching and perhaps crucially, to the restoration of the King's Garden at the Palace of Holyroodhouse. The Royal Warrant was issued on 12 January 1699, at the close of the 17th century.

Until 1956 the office of Regius Keeper was combined with the office of His/Her Majesty's Botanist (also established in 1699). Since then the office of HM Botanist has been honorary and conferred on a serving or retired Regius Keeper.

The following is a list of those who have held the office of Regius Keeper with the years in post.

- James Sutherland (1699–1715)
- William Arthur (1715)
- Charles Alston (1716–1760)
- John Hope (1761–1786)
- Daniel Rutherford (1786–1819)
- Robert Graham (1820–1845)
- John Hutton Balfour (1845–1879)
- Alexander Dickson (1880–1887)
- Isaac Bayley Balfour (1888–1922)
- William Wright Smith (1922–1956)
- Harold Roy Fletcher (1956–1970)
- Douglas Mackay Henderson (1970–1987)
- John McNeill (1987–1989)
- David Stanley Ingram (1990–1998)
- Stephen Blackmore (1999–2013)
- Simon Milne (2014–2026)
- Julia Knights (2026–present)

== See also ==
- His Majesty's Botanist
