= David S. Ingram =

David Stanley Ingram OBE VMH FRSB FRSE FLS

37th Master of St Catharine's College, Cambridge
- In office 2000–2007
- Preceded by: Terence English
- Succeeded by: Dame Jean Thomas

Regius Keeper of the Royal Botanic Garden Edinburgh
- In office 1990–1998
- Preceded by: John McNeill
- Succeeded by: Stephen Blackmore

Personal details
- Education: University of Hull

David Stanley Ingram, OBE, VMH, FRSB, FRSE, FLS, F.I. Hort (born 10 October 1941) is an Honorary Professor of Science, Technology and Innovation Studies at the University of Edinburgh Ingram served as master of St. Catharine's College, Cambridge, between 2000 and 2007.

== Early life and education ==
Ingram was born in Birmingham in 1941, the son of a toolmaker and grandson of a gamekeeper. From an early age he had an interest in botany. After graduating from Yardley Grammar School, he apprenticed as a gardener, but soon decided to study botany at a university. He selected the University of Hull because it enabled him to read botany in combination with geology and psychology, other nascent interests of his. Starting in 1960 at Hull, Ingram studied under Noel Robertson. After receiving a BSc in botany in 1963, Ingram stayed on at Hull to complete a PhD in Plant Pathology. During his PhD he worked as Robertson's research student and studied the interaction of Phytophthora infestans with tissue cultures of potato.

== Career ==
After receiving his doctorate, moved to the University of Glasgow in 1966 to work with Percy Wragg Brian. In Glasgow he taught and carried out research in Botany, Plant Pathology and Biotechnology. During this time he extended his work on the interaction between pathogens and host tissue cultures, notably with Plasmodiophora brassicae, cause of clubroot of brassicas.

In 1968, along with Brian, Ingram moved to the University of Cambridge. He first worked in the ARC Unit of Developmental Botany. In 1974 he was appointed as a lecturer in botany and became a fellow of Downing College. In 1988 he was elevated to reader in Plant Pathology at Cambridge. At Downing during this time he also served as Director of Studies in Biology, Dean, and Tutor for Graduate Students.

Between 1990 and 1998, Ingram was the Regius Keeper (director) of the Royal Botanic Garden, Edinburgh. He was concurrently honorary professor in Edinburgh and Glasgow Universities and RHS Professor of Horticulture while Regius Keeper.

He was then master of St Catharine's College, Cambridge, from 2000 to 2007. During this time he served as the Chair of the Colleges’ Committee and the Colleges’ representative on the Council of University Senate.

== Honours ==
Ingram is an Honorary Professor, at Edinburgh and Lancaster Universities. He is a visiting professor at Glyndwr University. He is also an Honorary Fellow of St. Catharine's and Downing College, Cambridge as well as at Worcester College, Oxford, the Royal Botanic Garden, Edinburgh, the Royal College of Physicians, Edinburgh, and Royal Scottish Geographical Society. He is also an Honorary Member of the British Society for Plant Pathology. He was awarded a Doctor of Science degree (ScD) by the University of Cambridge in 1986.

Academic offices
Preceded by Terence English	Master of St Catharine's College, Cambridge; 2000-2007	Succeeded by Jean Thomas
