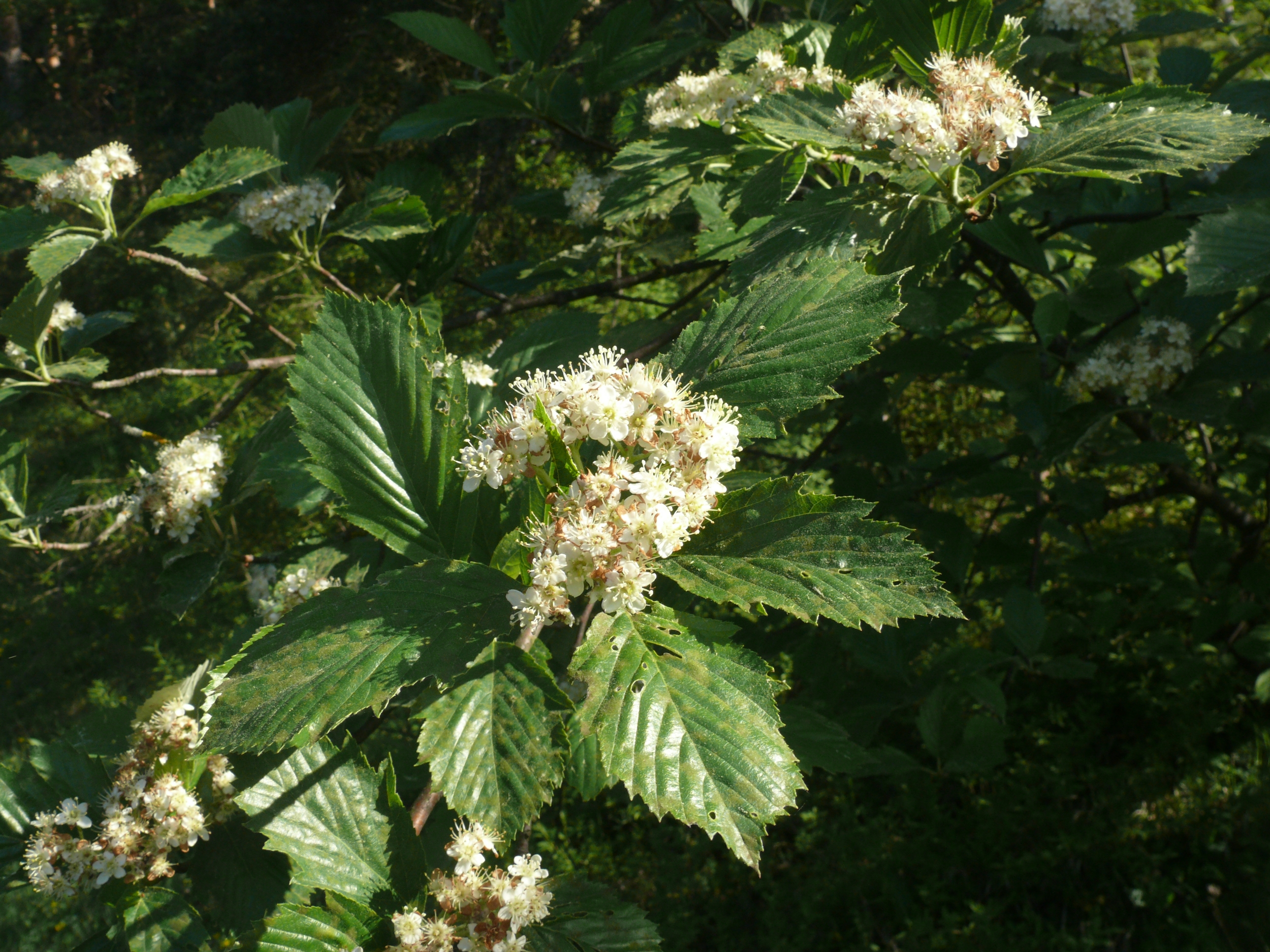
- Flowering Aria perlonga growing in Mainfranken, Germany

Conservation status
- Critically Endangered (IUCN 3.1)

Scientific classification
- Kingdom: Plantae
- Clade: Tracheophytes
- Clade: Angiosperms
- Clade: Eudicots
- Clade: Rosids
- Order: Rosales
- Family: Rosaceae
- Genus: Aria
- Species: A. perlonga

Binomial name
- Aria perlonga (Meierott) Mosyakin, Fedor. & McNeill
- It is endemic to Bavaria, Germany

Synonyms
- Karpatiosorbus perlonga (Meierott) Sennikov & Kurtto; Pyrus perlonga (Meierott) M.F.Fay & Christenh.; Sorbus perlonga Meierott

= Aria perlonga =

Species of tree

Aria perlonga, the long-leaved whitebeam, is an apomictic species of tree in the family Rosaceae endemic to Bavaria, Germany. It is extremely rare and threatened with extinction.

== Description ==
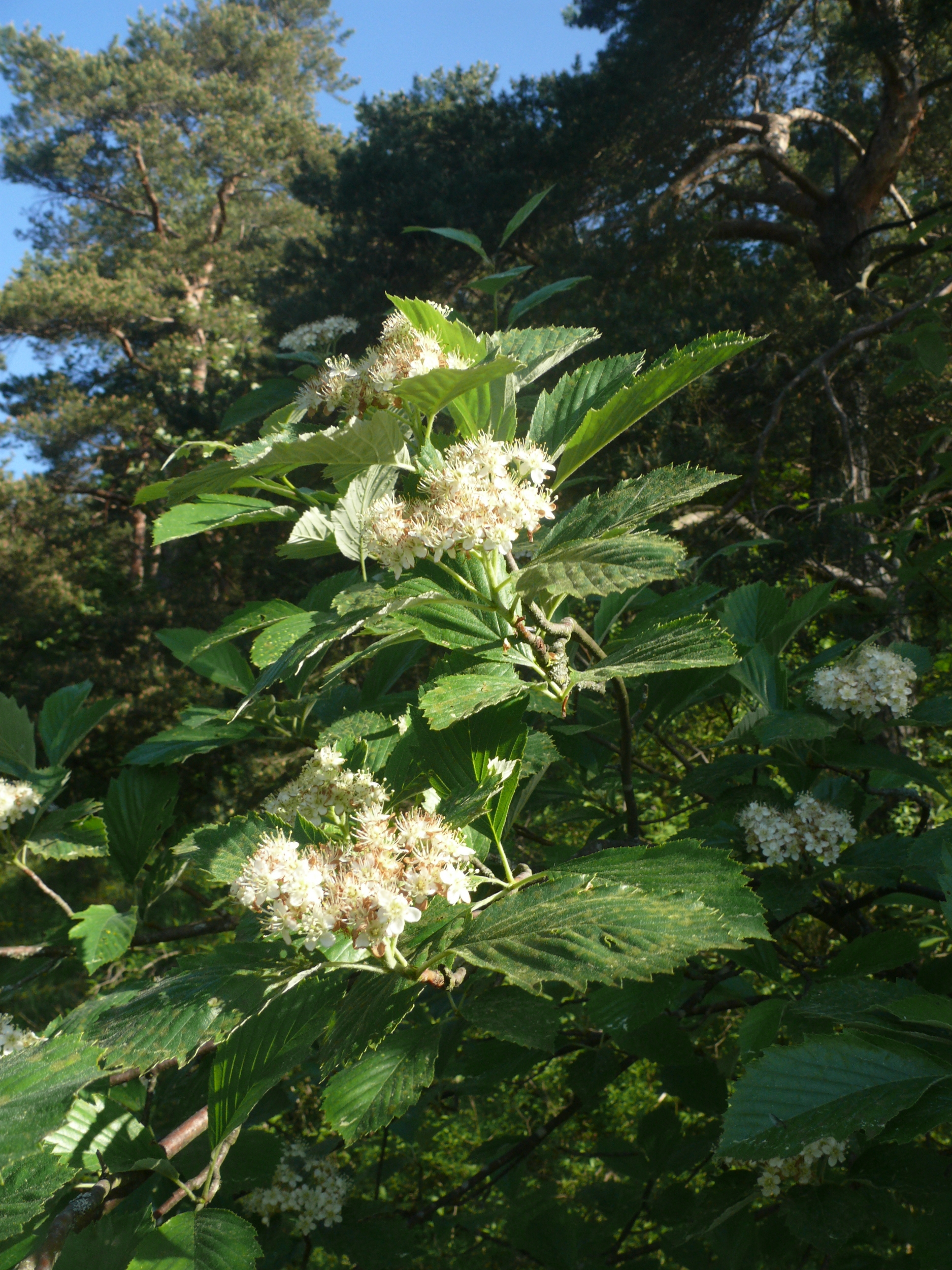
Flowering Aria perlonga growing in Mainfranken, Germany

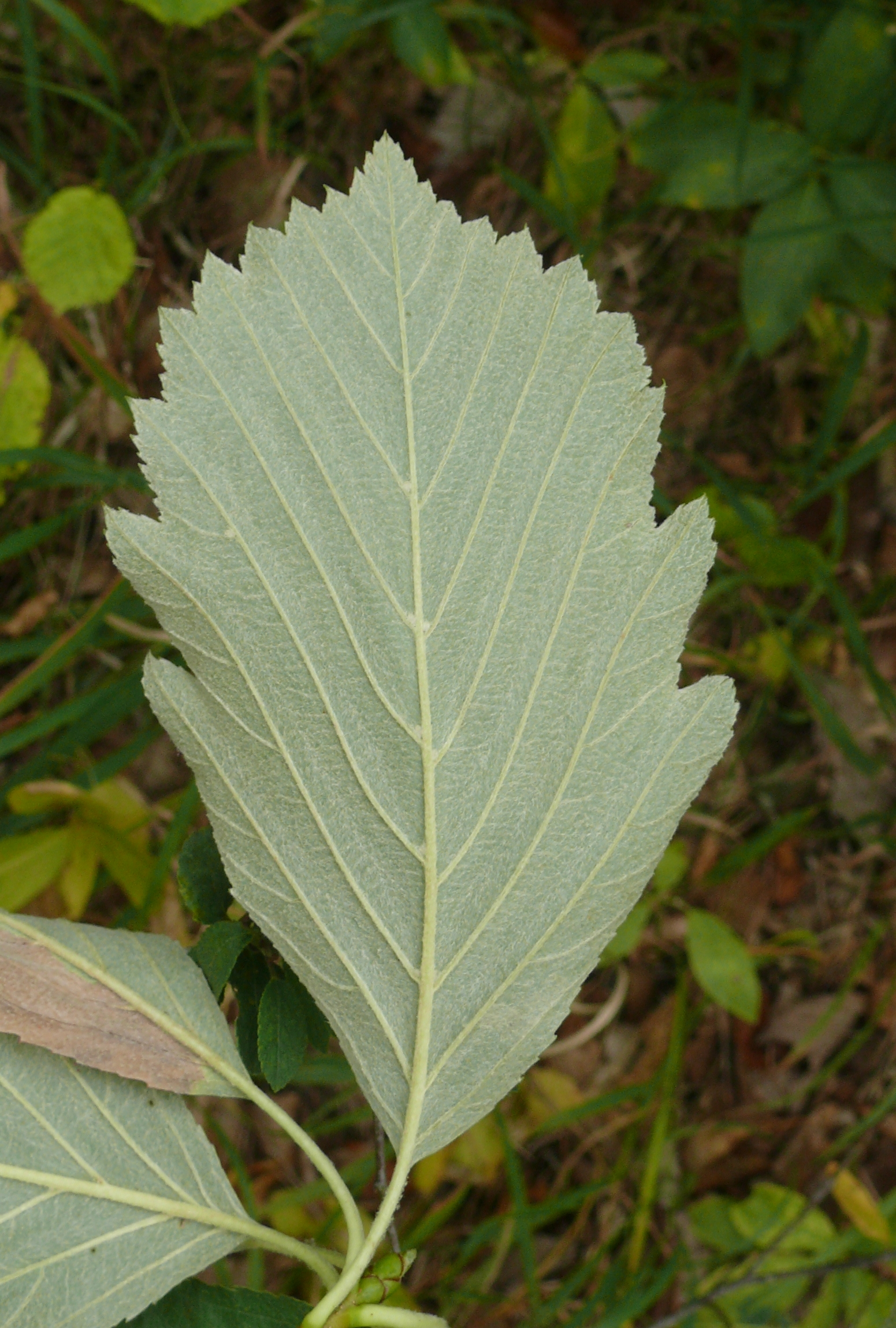
Abaxial surface of Aria perlonga leaf

=== Vegetative characteristics ===
Aria perlonga is a 5–10 m tall tree. The abaxial leaf surface is pubescent. The petiole is 2–2.5 cm long.

=== Generative characteristics ===
The inflorescence bears 25–30 white flowers. The white petals are faintly pubescent on the adaxial surface. The oval, yellow-orange accessory fruit bears few lenticels.

=== Cytology ===
The chromosome count is 2n = 3x = 51. It is triploid.

== Taxonomy ==
It was first described as Sorbus perlonga Meierott by Lenz Meierott in 2005. It was moved to the genus Aria (Pers.) J.Jacq. ex Host as Aria perlonga (Meierott) Mosyakin, Fedor. & McNeill by Sergei Leonidovich Mosyakin, Mykola Mykhaylovych Fedoronchuk, and John McNeill in 2025. The type specimen was collected on the 18th of May 2001 by N. Meyer, L. Meierott, and O. Angerer in Oberleinach, Germany.

=== Etymology ===
The specific epithet perlonga means very long.

== Distribution and habitat ==
Aria perlonga is endemic to a small area of only 12 km^{2} west of Würzburg, Bavaria, Germany, where it occurs in open pine forest and on the edges of deciduous forest at elevations of 250–350 meters above sea level. Another population near Trimburg has probably gone extinct.

== Conservation ==
It is a critically endangered species with a small population of only 30 saplings and 40 mature trees restricted to a small area. It is cultivated in three ex situ conservation collections.
