= Paul Weatherley =

British botanist

Professor Paul Weatherley FRS FRSE
- Born: 6 May 1917; Leicester
- Died: 8 August 2001 (aged 84); Torphins
- Education: Wyggeston Grammar School for Boys
- Alma mater: Oxford University
- Spouse: Margaret Logan Pirie
- Children: 4
- Scientific career
- Fields: Botany
- Institutions: University of Manchester
- Thesis: (1942)
- Academic advisors: A. G. Tansley
- Author abbrev. (botany): P. E. Weatherley

Paul Egerton Weatherley (6 May 1917– 8 August 2001) was a British botanist. In authorship he is usually known as P. E. Weatherley.

== Life ==
He was born in Leicester on 6 May 1917, the son of Leonard Roger Weatherley and his wife, Ethel Maude Collin. He was educated at Wyggeston Grammar School for Boys.

He won a scholarship to Oxford University studying Botany under A. G. Tansley and graduated MA in 1939. He then won a further scholarship from the Colonial Office to study tropical agriculture, gaining a doctorate in 1942 and then being posted to Africa as Government Botanist to the Department of Agriculture in Uganda. His journey to Uganda was extremely eventful as his ship was sunk by a German U-boat off the coast of Africa and he spent 18 hours in a lifeboat before being rescued.

He stayed in Uganda until 1947 when he returned to lecture at the University of Manchester. In 1949 he went to the University of Nottingham being promoted to senior lecturer in 1956.

In 1959 he was made Professor of Botany at the University of Aberdeen. Whilst there he became a member of the Cairngorm Club and was an elder at St Machar's Cathedral.

In 1960 he was elected a Fellow of the Royal Society of Edinburgh. His proposers were James Robert Matthews, Robert Brown, Harold Fletcher and Brian Burtt. He was made a Fellow of the Royal Society of London in 1973.

He retired to Torphins in 1981. Sadly he developed Parkinson's disease.

He died in Torphins in Aberdeenshire on 8 August 2001.

== Family ==
In 1943 he married Margaret Logan Pirie. They had three daughters and a son.

== Publications ==
- A Porometer for use in the Field (1966)
- Some Aspects of the Munch Hypothesis (1975)
- Hydraulic Resistance of the Soil-Root Interface (1979)
- Root Contraction in Transpiring Plants (1982)
- Water Uptake and Flow in Roots (1982)
