= William Arthur (botanist) =

William Arthur (1680–1716) was a Scottish doctor who served as Regius Keeper of the Royal Botanic Garden and King's Botanist at Edinburgh. Shortly afterwards he was deeply implicated in the Jacobite rising of 1715. He fled to Italy, where he died the following year "from a surfeit of figs."

== Early life ==
William was born in Elie, Fifeshire in 1680 to Patrick Arthur of Ballone, a surgeon and apothecary and Commissioner of Supply for Fifeshire. His mother was Margaret Sharp, a relative of Archbishop James Sharp of St. Andrews who had been assassinated in Fife in 1679. William travelled to Utrecht in the early 18th century to study medicine under Dutch physician and "father of physiology", Herman Boerhaave. He graduated as Doctor of Medicine in March 1707 and returned to his native Scotland, initially practising medicine in Elie. He relocated to Edinburgh in 1713 and was admitted to the Royal College of Physicians, being made a Fellow in 1714.

== Marriage ==
He married Barbara Clerk in 1710, widow of John Lawson, Laird of Cairnmuir, daughter of Sir John Clerk of Penicuik, 1st Baronet and sister of Sir John Clerk of Penicuik, known as Baron Clerk. Both her father and brother were both prominent Whig politicians and pro-Hanoverian. To William, the marriage gave political connections at the highest levels of the Scottish establishment and society that found him "associating with the most influential people, and beyond suspicion of any want of loyalty - against that his wife's relationships protected him".

== Botanist to the King ==
On the accession of King George I, the long-standing Regius Keeper of the Royal Botanic Garden in Edinburgh was James Sutherland, King's Botanist and Professor of Botany. The Regius Keeper is a household appointment granted directly by Royal Warrant from the monarch and it was surprising that the experienced incumbent was replaced by William Arthur, who as doctor of medicine had no apparent qualification or skill for the role beyond a physician's knowledge of botanical herbs and plants. It is likely that the appointment was entirely on the merit of his political connections through Sir John Clerk. The biographer of the Regius Keepers of the Botanic Garden, Bayley Balfour, states that during his tenure, Arthur likely "performed few or none of [his] professional or other administrative duties" and left behind a "silence of botanical tradition".

== Jacobite Plot ==
William Arthur was accused of being central to a Jacobite plot to capture Edinburgh Castle during the rising in September 1715. The tale is recounted by Sir Walter Scott in his Tales of a Grandfather. William's younger brother, Thomas Arthur, an Ensign in The Third Regiment of Foot Guards and their cousin James Arthur, a Lieutenant in Edinburgh Regiment of Foot were also implicated. William was alleged to have been one of the overall organisers of the plot on behalf of John Erskine, Earl of Mar, while Thomas bribed a sergeant and two privates of the Castle garrison to assist in pulling up rope ladders from below for a Jacobite storming party and James was to provide forty "loyal" soldiers from his regiment from within the Castle. The assault party itself was to consist of fifty Highlanders from the estate of the exiled James Drummond, 4th Earl of Perth, and fifty local Jacobites drawn from "officers, writers' (lawyers') clerks, apprentices and other youths of a class considerably above the mere vulgar". The leader of this force was Alexander MacGregor of Bahaldie, chieftain of Clan Gregor, a "gentleman of great courage". They were to be well armed, 30 muskets with bayonets and "a great many" small arms.

The plot however quickly descended into farce. The younger members of the raiding party got drunk in a public tavern and were overheard, allowing word to be sent to Sir Adam Cockburn of Ormiston, Lord Justice-Clerk who raised the alarm with the deputy governor of the Castle. The sentries on the wall were thus forewarned and the guarding watches changed, meaning that the soldiers bribed to assist the assault would have less time and discretion to fulfil their part of the bargain. The raiding party rendezvoused under the cover of darkness at the West Kirk at 11PM before climbing the Castle Rock and assembled at the agreed point below the castle walls where the ladders were to be pulled up by their accomplices on the Castle walls. The merchant and Jacobite agent, Charles Forbes, who had been paid to make the ladders was however notably absent and the party had only a single ladder and grapnel with them which proved to be too short. At half past eleven when the relief guards arrived early thanks to the forewarning the plot was exposed. The erstwhile raiders at the foot of the walls fled, but not before a party from the Edinburgh Town Guard intercepted and captured three youths of their number and one Captain Maclean, a former officer in the service of King James, who had fallen on the rocks. The remainder scattered to the north where they encountered the delayed Charles Forbes, coming the opposite way with the awaited but now redundant assault ladders.

The Highlanders of the party headed north for Kinross. The luckless sergeant on the walls was captured, court-martialled and hanged for his crime and the Deputy Governor. Lieutenant-Colonel Stewart, was relieved of his command and imprisoned. William Arthur recounted in a letter sent later to the Earl of Mar how he had then fled the city with a few other conspirators to the house of his niece in Polton, where they acquired horses and rode through the Pentland Hills to the house of another relative, a sister of his father-in-law Sir John Clerk. From here, he corresponded with his wife in Edinburgh who informed him by return that his part in the plot was known and that she had been visited and questioned by her brother Baron Clerk and other senior figures with family connections. William gathered money and fresh horses from his wife's estates of Cairnmuir in the Scottish Borders and was helped across the border into England by Jacobite sympathisers in Teviotdale. After this, the authorities in Edinburgh claimed that Arthur and his cousin, William Cunningham of Barnes, thereafter met with the Earl of Mar "with intelligence" and were later present at the Battle of Preston where the rising finally failed.

== Later life and death ==
William Arthur was next heard of in Rome, where he died in 1716 from dysentery after consuming a "surfeit of figs". He is alleged to have written his account of the plot on his death bed, to clear himself of allegations that he had lost his nerve and that he had betrayed the plot by informing his wife. This was conveyed to the Earl of Mar in Paris, along with the news of Arthur's death by Dr Roger Kenyon, a Jacobite agent. William was buried in Rome by his sympathisers and was the first to be interred in the Protestant Cemetery in that city, a privilege which had been conferred directly from Filippo Gualterio, Cardinal Protector of Scotland. Mar wrote posthumously on Arthur in a letter to a Jacobite agent:

1716, November 15. A countryman of yours, a very pretty young man, is lately dead at Rome, Dr. Arthur and his brother Tom, who is at Francis' quarters, has fallen so ill on it, that 'tis feared he'll die too. The Doctor at his death, I hear, declared he was a Presbyterian, but a loyal one, as he called it, which he thought was not at all inconsistent. You know what was his kind of loyalty. Pray are many of your Presbyterians of his opinion?

— The Duke of Mar to Captain Harry Straton,
