= Stephen Blackmore =

British botanist

Stephen Blackmore CBE FRSE FRSB FLS
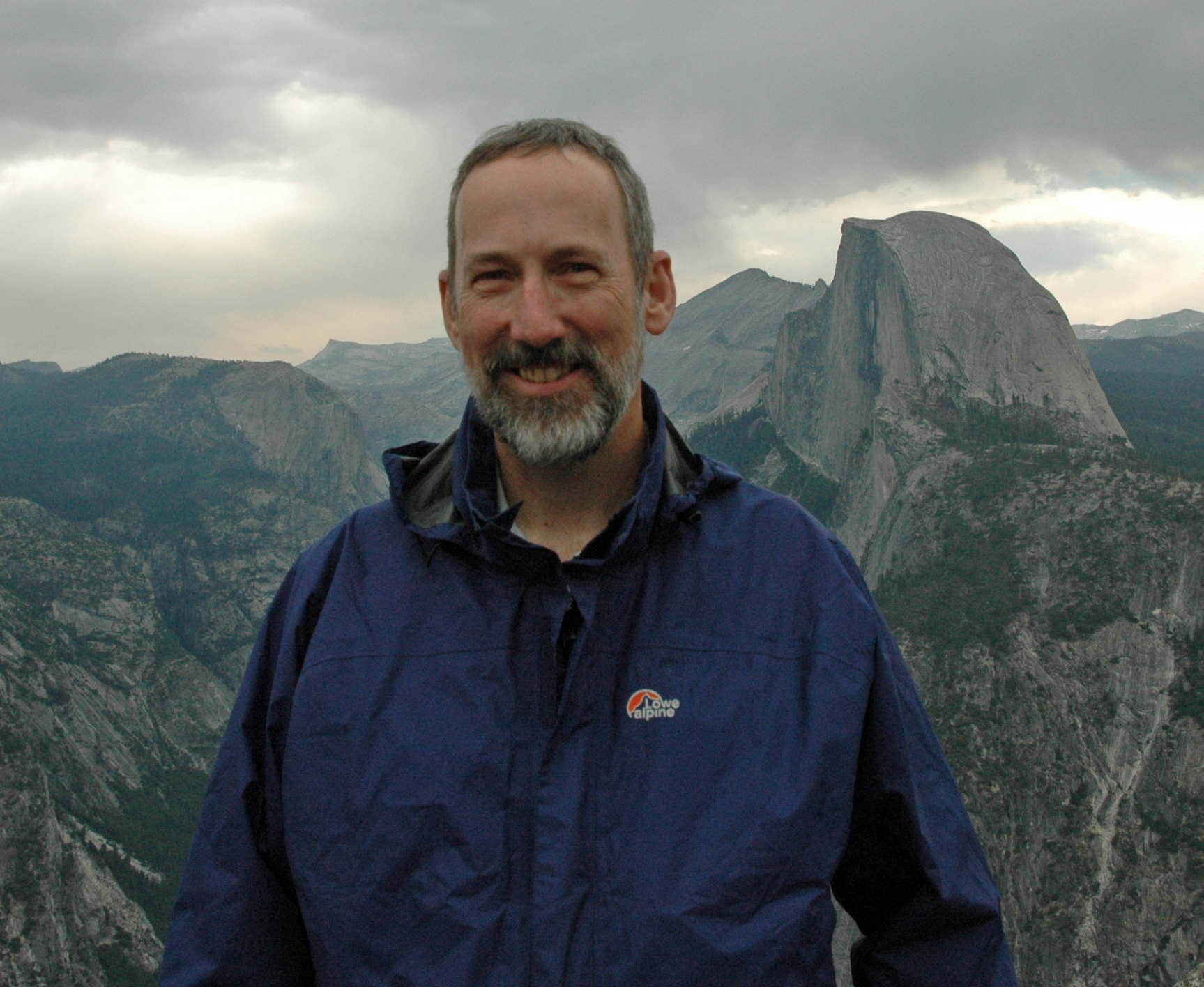
- Blackmore in Yosemite National Park

Regius Keeper of the Royal Botanic Garden Edinburgh
- In office 1999 – 20 December 2013
- Preceded by: David S. Ingram
- Succeeded by: Simon Milne

Personal details
- Education: University of Reading

Stephen Blackmore CBE FRSE FRSB FLS (born 30 July 1952) is a British botanist, who was educated at St. George's School, Hong Kong and the University of Reading where he completed his PhD in 1976 on the "Palynology and Systematics of the Cichorieae". He was elected a fellow of the Linnean Society of London in 1976. He then worked at the Royal Society of London’s Research Station on Aldabra Atoll in the Indian Ocean before being appointed Lecturer in Biology and Head of the National Herbarium and Botanic Garden at the University of Malawi. In 1980, he was appointed Head of Palynology at Natural History Museum in London and from 1990 to 1999 served there as Keeper of Botany. In 1985 he organized, together with Keith Ferguson, the Linnean Society symposium "Pollen and Spores: Form and Function" and in 1990, together with Susan Barnes, "Pollen and Spores: Patterns of Diversification". He was the 15th Regius Keeper of the Royal Botanic Garden Edinburgh from 1999 until 20 December 2013, and was appointed His Majesty's Botanist in Scotland in 2010.

Blackmore has received three awards from the Linnean Society of London: the Trail-Crisp Medal Award in 1987; the Bicentenary Medal of the Linnean Society in 1992; and the Linnean Medal in 2012. The Royal Caledonian Horticultural Society awarded him the Scottish Horticultural Medal in 2008, and the Royal Horticultural Society presented him the Victoria Medal of Honour in 2012. In the 2011 New Year Honours list he was appointed a CBE for "services to plant conservation".

In 2013 Blackmore was appointed Chairman of the Darwin Expert Committee of the Darwin Initiative and, since 2014, he has also been Chairman of Botanic Gardens Conservation International. He served on the board of the Seychelles Islands Foundation from 1997 until 2022.
