= Daniel Rutherford =

British chemist and botanist (1749-1819)

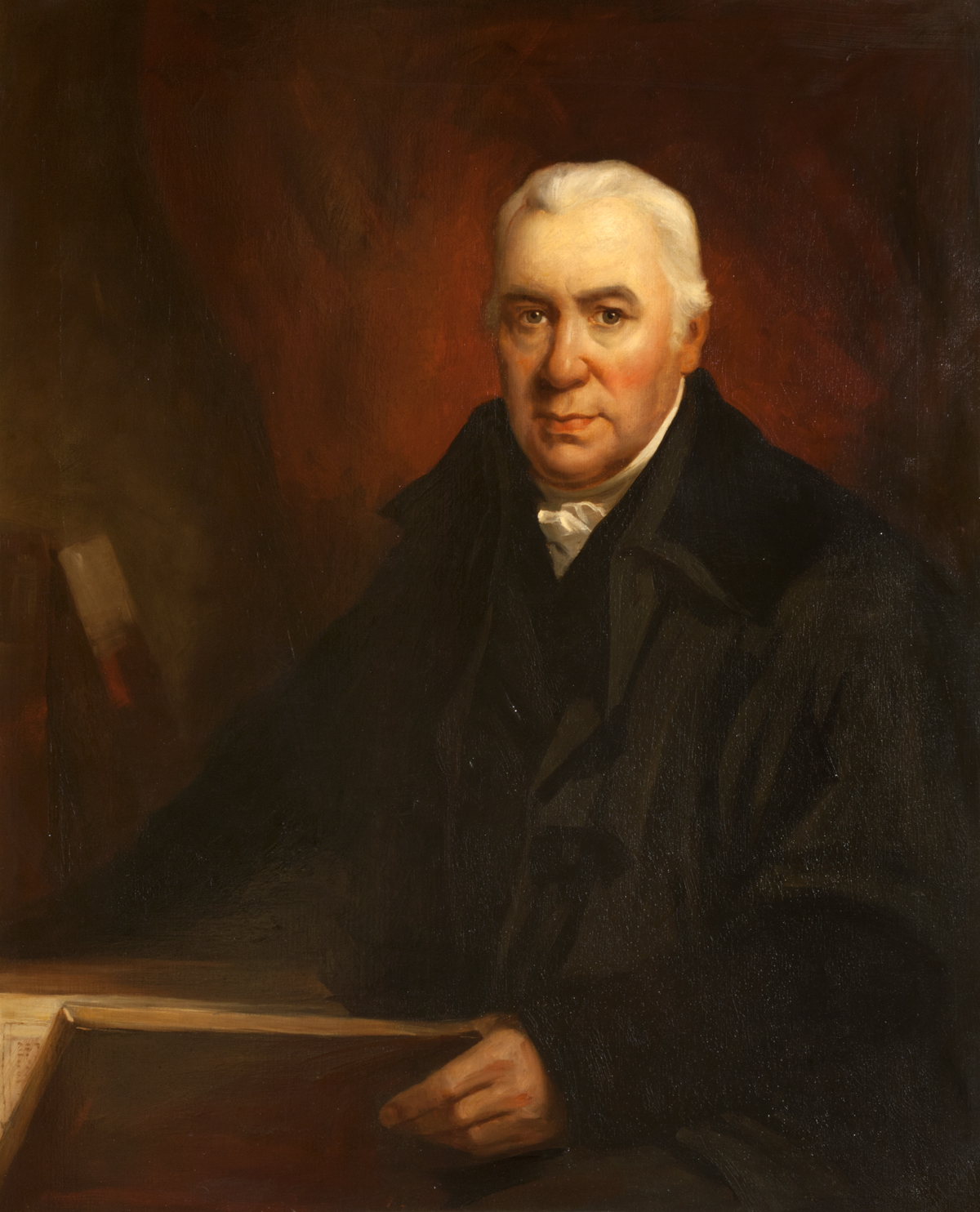
- Born: 3 November 1749; Edinburgh, Scotland
- Died: 15 November 1819 (aged 70); Edinburgh, Scotland
- Education: University of Edinburgh
- Known for: isolation of nitrogen
- Scientific career
- Fields: Chemistry
- Workplaces: Physician, Edinburgh (1775–86); Professor of medicine and botany, University of Edinburgh; Keeper, Royal Botanic Garden, Edinburgh (1786–1819); King's Botanist in Scotland (1786-); Physician, Edinburgh Royal Infirmary (1791)
- Author abbrev. (botany): Rutherf.

Daniel Rutherford FRSE FRCPE FLS FSA(Scot) (3 November 1749 – 15 November 1819) was a Scottish physician, chemist and botanist who is known for the isolation of nitrogen in 1772.

== Life ==
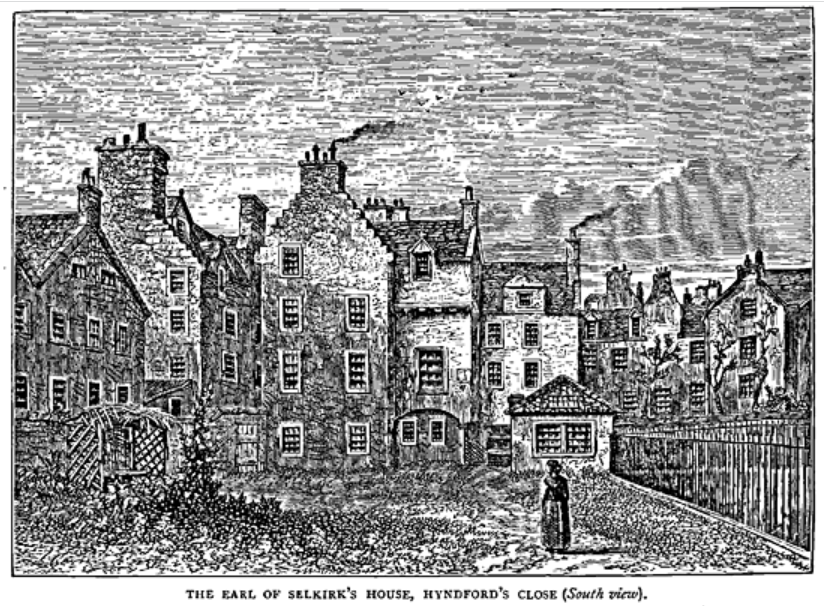
The 4th Earl of Selkirk's house on Hyndford's Close in Edinburgh, later owned by Daniel Rutherford

Rutherford was born on 3 November 1749, the son of Anne Mackay and Professor John Rutherford (1695–1779). He began college at the age of 16 at Mundell's School on the West Bow close to his family home, and then studied medicine under William Cullen and Joseph Black at the University of Edinburgh, graduating with a doctorate (MD) in 1772. From 1775 to 1786 he practiced as a physician in Edinburgh.

On 12 April 1782 Rutherford was one of the founding members of the Harveian Society of Edinburgh and served as President in 1787. In 1783 he was a joint founder of the Royal Society of Edinburgh. In 1784 he was elected a member of the Aesculapian Club. At this time he lived at Hyndford Close on the Royal Mile a house he (or his father) had purchased from Dunbar Douglas, 4th Earl of Selkirk

He was a professor of botany at the University of Edinburgh and the 5th Regius Keeper of the Royal Botanic Garden Edinburgh from 1786 to 1819. He was president of the Royal College of Physicians of Edinburgh from 1796 to 1798.

His pupils included Thomas Brown of Lanfine and Waterhaughs.

Around 1805 he moved from Hyndfords Close to a newly built townhouse at 20 Picardy Place at the top of Leith Walk, where he lived for the rest of his life.

He died suddenly in Edinburgh on 15 November 1819. His sister died two days later and the second sister (Scott's mother) only seven days after the latter.

== Family ==
He was the uncle of novelist Sir Walter Scott.

In 1786 he married Harriet Mitchelson of Middleton.

== Isolation of nitrogen ==
Rutherford discovered nitrogen by the isolation of the gas in 1772. When Joseph Black was studying the properties of carbon dioxide, he found that a candle would not burn in it. Black turned this problem over to his student at the time, Rutherford. Rutherford kept a mouse in a space with a confined quantity of air until it died. Then, he burned a candle in the remaining air until it went out. Afterwards, he burned phosphorus in that, until it would not burn. Then the air was passed through a carbon dioxide absorbing solution. The remaining component of the air did not support combustion, and a mouse could not live in it.

Rutherford called the gas (which we now know would have consisted primarily of nitrogen) "noxious air" or "phlogisticated air". Rutherford reported the experiment in 1772. He and Black were convinced of the validity of the phlogiston theory, so they explained their results in terms of it.
