= J. Douglas Wetmore =

Florida lawyer

Judson Douglas Wetmore
- Born: 1870
- Died: July 30, 1930 (aged 59–60); Greenwich, Connecticut
- Occupation: American lawyer

Judson Douglas Wetmore (died 1930) was a lawyer in Jacksonville, Florida. He and Isaac Lawrence Purcell challenged state law requiring segregated streetcars (Avery Law).

A nasty comic of him relating to a city council election was published.

He corresponded with W. E. B. Du Bois. He was a childhood friend and business partner of James Weldon Johnson. He wrote to Booker T. Washington.

Wetmore moved to New York City with his family. He criticized discrimination at the federal level. Booker T. Washington was critical of him.

James Weldon Johnson fictionalized an African American passing as white in his book, An Ex-Colored Man. He advertised his office at 5 Beekman Street in New York City.

He had two brothers. In 1930 his health was failing and he committed suicide by shooting himself at his summer home in Greenwich, Connecticut. He married twice and had three children.
