= Royal Botanic Garden Edinburgh =

Botanical garden in Edinburgh, Scotland

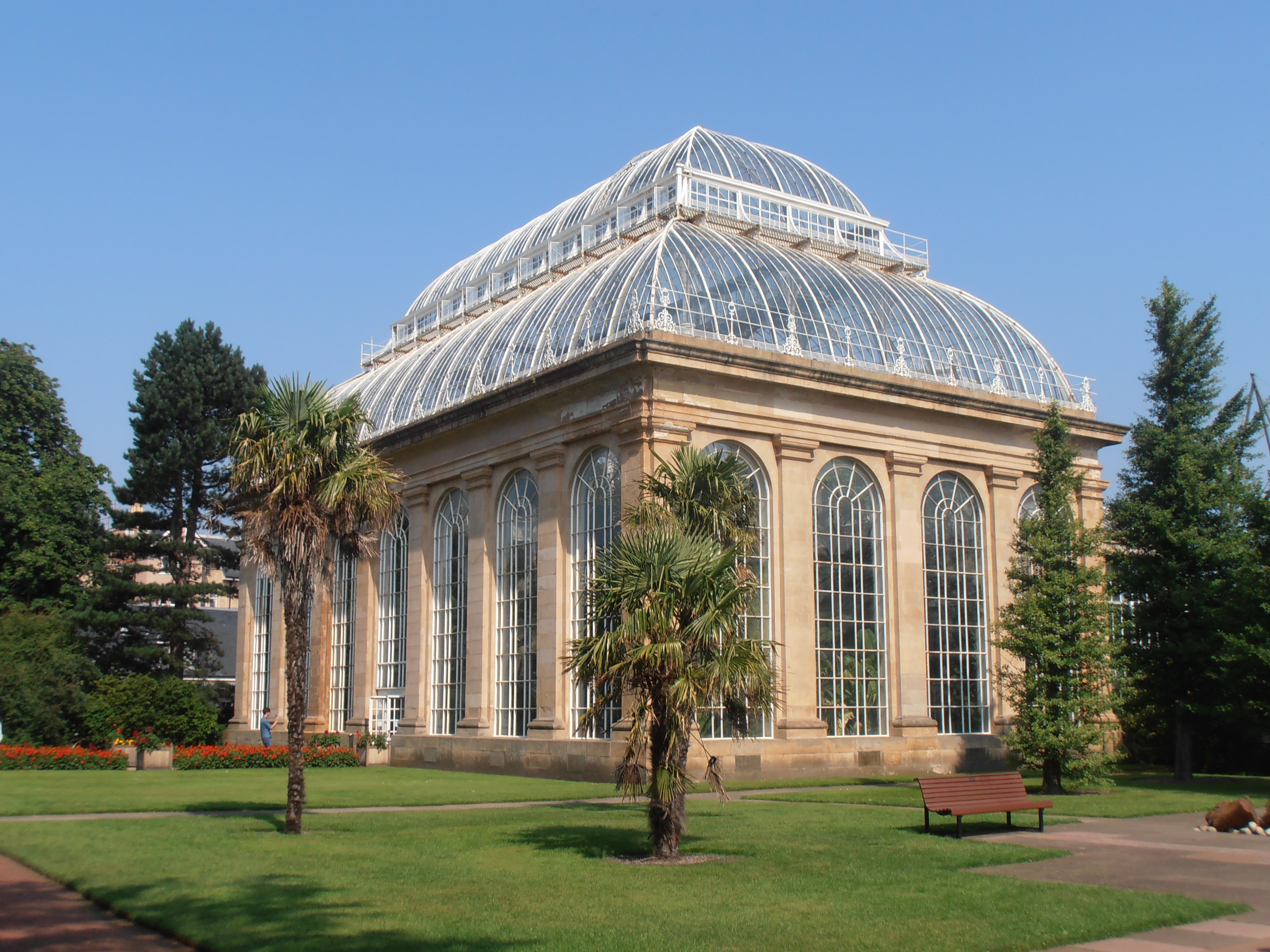
- The Palm House in the Royal Botanic Garden

Non Departmental Public Body overview
- Formed: 1670 (in Holyrood Park); 1820 (moved to current Inverleith site)
- Preceding agencies: 1. the country's first physic garden, near Holyrood Abbey, in Holyrood Park; 2. a site to the east of the Nor Loch, now built over by Waverley Station; 3. a site off Leith Walk on the road to Leith
- Type: Executive Non Departmental Public Body; Registered charity (number SC007983)
- Jurisdiction: Scottish Government
- Headquarters: 20A Inverleith Row Edinburgh EH3 5LR; 55°57′54″N 3°12′36″W
- Employees: 250
- Annual budget: £12.3 million (2010–11)
- Minister responsible: Gillian Martin, Cabinet Secretary for Climate Action and Rural Affairs
- Non Departmental Public Body executive: Dr Julia Knights, Regius Keeper, Chief Executive Officer and Accountable Officer
- Parent department: Economy Directorates
- Child agencies: Benmore Botanic Garden, Argyll; Dawyck Botanic Garden, Borders; Logan Botanic Garden, Galloway
- Website: www.rbge.org.uk

Designations

Inventory of Gardens and Designed Landscapes in Scotland
- Official name: Royal Botanic Garden, Edinburgh
- Designated: 30 June 1987
- Reference no.: GDL00334

The Royal Botanic Garden Edinburgh (RBGE) is a scientific centre for the study of plants, their diversity and conservation, as well as a popular visitor attraction. Founded in 1670 as a physic garden to grow medicinal plants, today it occupies four sites across Scotland—Edinburgh, Dawyck, Logan and Benmore—each with its own specialist collection. The RBGE's living collection consists of more than 13,302 plant species (34,422 accessions), whilst the herbarium contains in excess of 3 million preserved specimens.

The Royal Botanic Garden Edinburgh is an executive non-departmental public body of the Scottish Government. The Edinburgh site is the main garden and the headquarters of the public body, which is led by Regius Keeper Dr Julia Knights.

== History ==
The Edinburgh botanic garden was founded in 1670 at St. Anne's Yard, near Holyrood Palace, by Robert Sibbald and Andrew Balfour. It is the second oldest botanic garden in the UK after Oxford's. The plant collection used as the basis of the garden was the private collection of Sir Patrick Murray, 2nd Lord Elibank, moved from his home at Livingston Peel in 1672 following his death in September 1671. The original site was "obtained of John Brown, gardener of the North Yardes in the Holyrood Abby, an inclosure of some 40 foot of measure every way. By what we procured from Levingstone and other gardens, we made a collection of eight or nine hundred plants yr." This site proved too small, and in 1676 grounds belonging to Trinity Hospital were leased by Balfour from the City Council: this second garden was sited just to the east of the Nor Loch, down from the High Street.

In the spring of 1689, for certain strategic military reasons, the Nor Loch which lay west of the Physic Garden was drained, resulting in the flooding of the garden (which at this stage had wholly relocated to the Trinity Hospital site), with much mud and general rubbish being deposited, to the ruination of many of the plants. Partly for this reason and partly due to necessary expansion the facility relocated to the Holyrood site in 1695.

John Ainslie's 1804 map shows it as the "Old Physick Garden" to the east of the North Bridge. The site was subsequently occupied by tracks of the North British Railway, and a plaque at platform 11 of the Waverley railway station marks its location.

In 1763, the garden's collections were moved away from the city's pollution to a larger (five acre) "Physick Garden" on the west side of Leith Walk, all under the control of Prof John Hope. This site is shown in Ainslie's 1804 map. The site is today known as Hopetoun Crescent Gardens and is one of the collection of New Town Gardens.

Some time prior to Hope's death (1786), he was brought Turkish rhubarb seeds by Bruce of Kinnaird and this was the first rhubarb grown in Great Britain. As this proved successful, over 3000 plants were grown as rhubarb was previously an expensive import (used as a medicine).

A cottage from the garden's original site remained on Leith Walk for over one hundred years. In 2008, the building was moved brick by brick to a site within the current gardens. The project was completed in 2016. The garden was a popular destination for botanists and supplied plants to other gardens such as Kew. Hope erected a monument to Carl Linnaeus on the site in 1778.

In the early 1820s under the direction of the Curator, William McNab, the garden moved west to its present location (adjacent to Inverleith Row), and the Leith Walk site was built over between Hopetoun Crescent and Haddington Place. The Temperate Palm House, which remains the tallest in Scotland, was built in 1858.

In 1877, the city acquired Inverleith House from the estate of Cosmo Innes and added it to the existing gardens, opening the remodelled grounds to the public in 1881.

The botanic garden at Benmore became the first Regional Garden of the RBGE in 1929. It was followed by the gardens at Logan and Dawyck in 1969 and 1978.

Currently, the RBGE is creating a digital record of its Herbarium collection of over three million preserved plant specimens from 157 countries. Historically hard to access, it is now being digitised into images with a resolution of 600 PPI (pixels per inch) that can be viewed by anyone with an internet connection. The digitised platform now sees requests come in from across the globe from students, scientists and plant enthusiasts.

The one millionth specimen to be digitised was Stereocaulon vesuvianum, a species of lichen collected from Ben Nevis in 2021.

RBGE lichenologist Dr Rebecca Yahr, who collected the specimen during a climb up Scotland's tallest mountain, said: "Celebrating the milestone with this important specimen is an exciting opportunity for us to highlight Scotland's unique biodiversity and extend RBGE's mission to research and understand lichens more generally."

== Notable staff and residents ==
- Charles Alston (1683–1760), 3rd Regius Keeper 1716–1760
- William Arthur (1680–1716), 2nd Regius Keeper 1715
- Isaac Bayley Balfour (1853–1922), 9th Regius Keeper 1888–1922
- John Hutton Balfour (1808–1884), 7th Regius Keeper 1845–1879, lived in Inverleith House
- Stephen Blackmore (b. 1952), 15th Regius Keeper 1999–2013
- Francis Buchanan (1762–1829), Keeper from 1814 to 1829
- Roland Edgar Cooper (1890–1962), curator
- Alexander Dickson (1836–1887), 8th Regius Keeper 1880–1887
- William Evans (1851–1922), born here (son of William Wilson Evans, Curator)
- Harold Roy Fletcher (1907–1978), 11th Regius Keeper 1956–1970
- Mary Gibby (1949–2024), pteridologist and professor
- Robert Graham (1786–1845), 6th Regius Keeper 1820–1845
- John Hope (1725–1786), 4th Regius Keeper 1761–1786 and Keeper of the Leith Walk site
- David Stanley Ingram (b. 1941) 14th Regius Keeper 1990–1998
- Cosmo Innes (1798–1874), original owner of Inverleith House
- John Mackay (1772–1802), laid out the Leith Walk site
- Douglas Mackay Henderson (1927–2007), 12th Regius Keeper 1970–1987
- William Gregor MacKenzie (1904–1995), Curator, Chelsea Physic Garden
- John McNeill (b. 1933), 13th Regius Keeper 1987–1989
- Simon Milne (b. 1959), 16th Regius Keeper 2014–2026
- Matthew Young Orr (1883–1953), botanist
- William Roxburgh (1751–1815), Keeper in 1814
- Daniel Rutherford (1749–1819), 5th Regius Keeper 1786–1819
- James Sutherland (c. 1639–1719), 1st Regius Keeper 1699–1715
- George Taylor (1904–1993), director
- William Wright Smith (1875–1956), 10th Regius Keeper 1922–1956

== The garden in Edinburgh ==
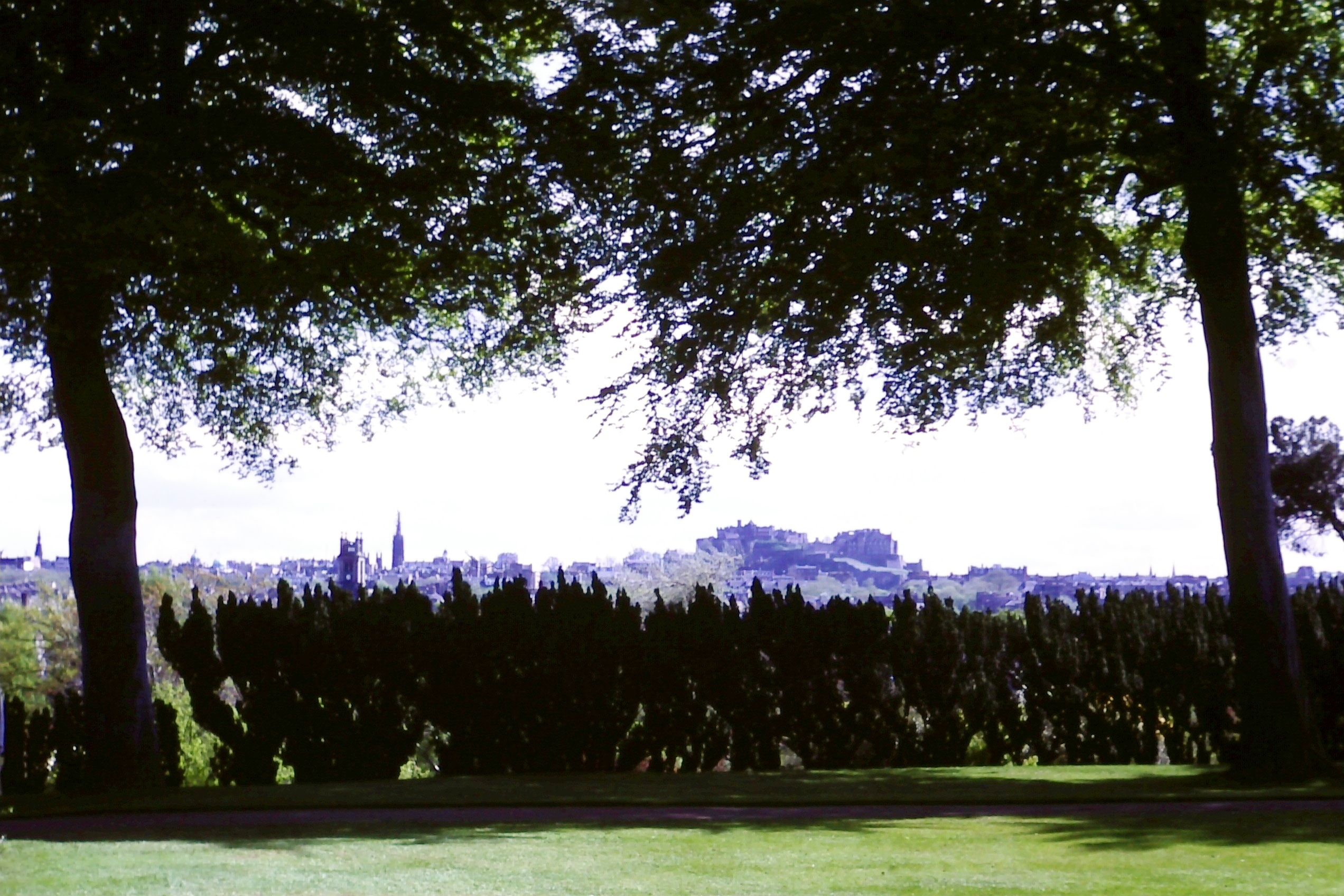
Edinburgh's skyline as seen from the garden

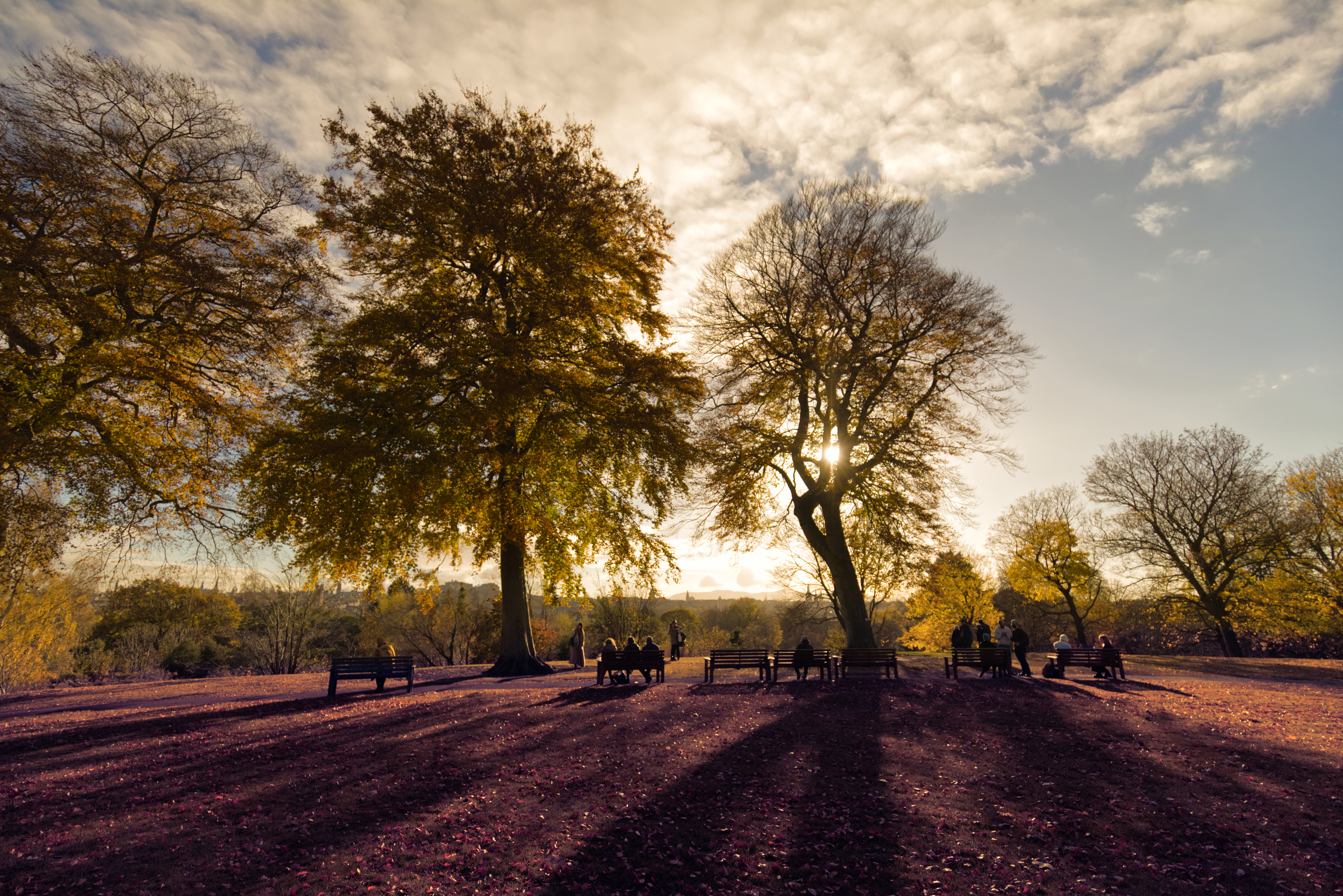
The Royal Botanic Garden Edinburgh is also a place to relax and enjoy

The Botanic Garden's main site in Edinburgh is part of a worldwide network of institutions seeking to ensure that biodiversity is not further eroded. Located one mile from the city centre, it covers 70 acres (28 ha).

The RBGE is actively involved in, and coordinates numerous in situ and ex situ conservation projects both in the UK and internationally. The three main cross-cutting themes of scientific work at the RBGE are: Scottish Biodiversity, Plants & Climate Change, and Conservation.

In addition to the RBGE's scientific activities the garden remains a popular destination for both tourists and locals. Locally known as "The Botanics", the garden is a popular place to go for a walk, particularly with young families. Entrance to the botanic garden is free, although a small entry charge exists for the glasshouses. During the year the garden hosts many events including live performances, guided tours and exhibitions. The RBGE is also an important centre for education, offering taught courses across all levels.

In 2010, the John Hope Gateway was opened. John Hope was the first Regius Keeper of RBGE.

=== Living collection ===
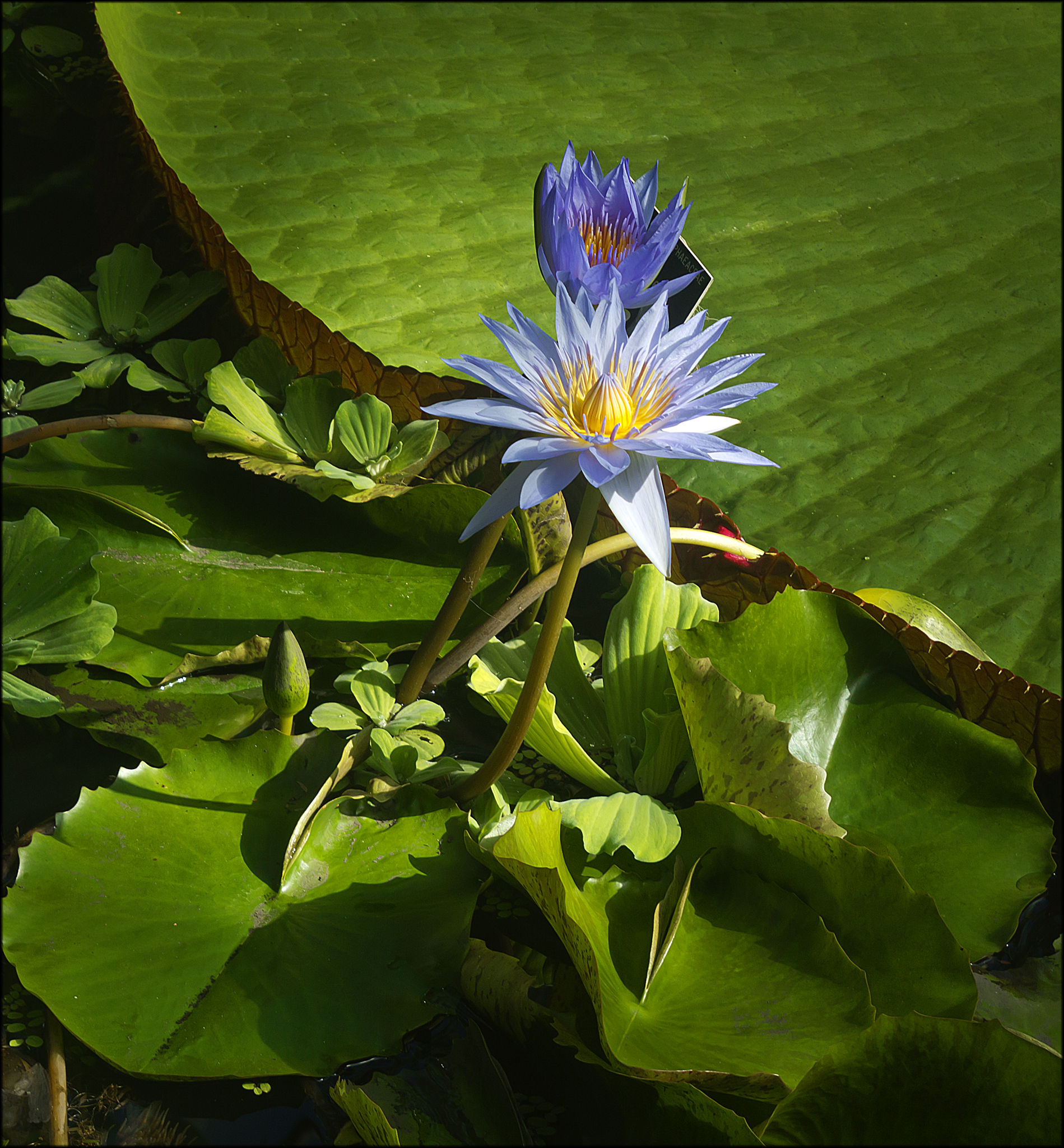
Nymphaea in the Royal Botanic Garden

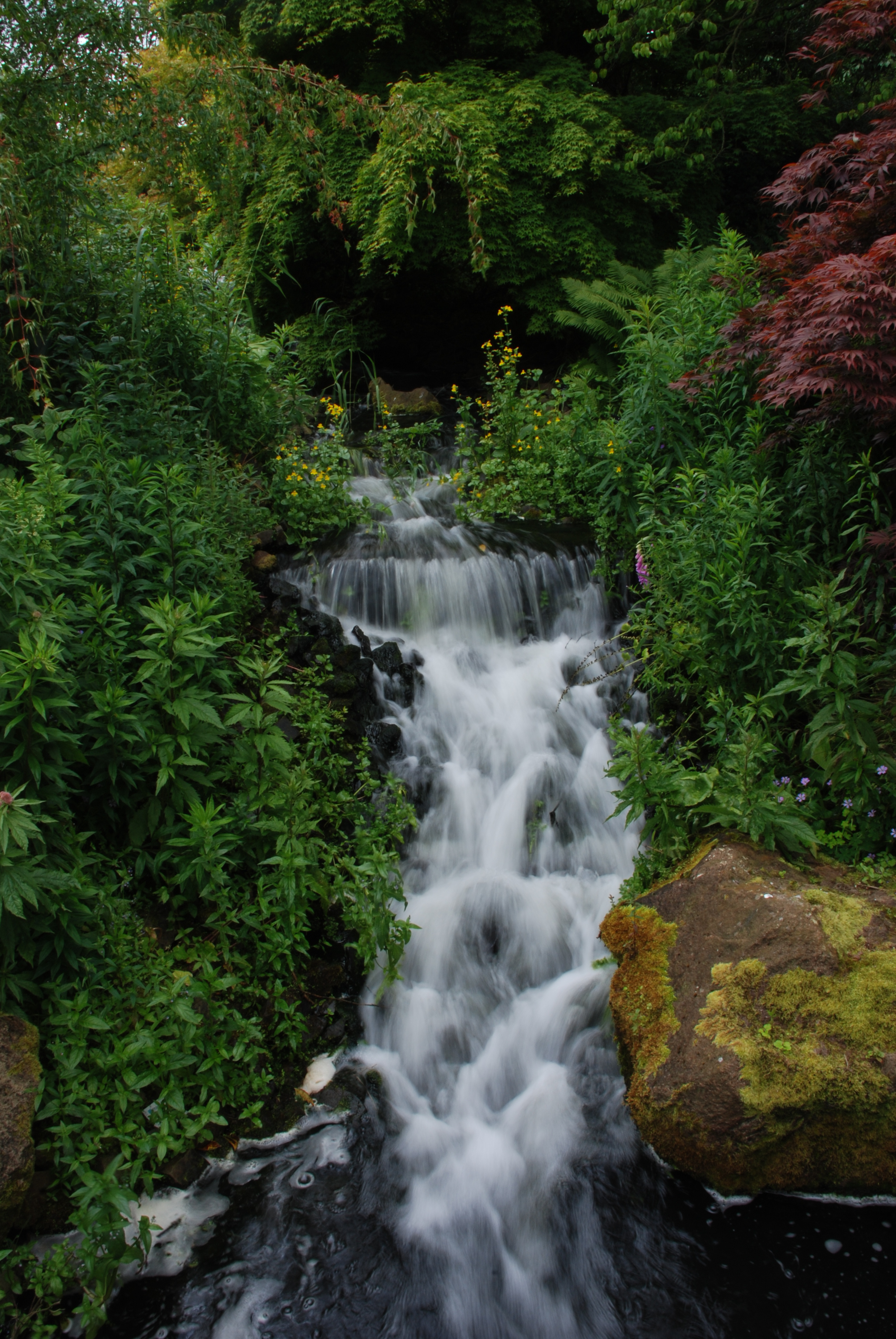
Waterfall in the rock garden

Nearly 273,000 individual plants are grown at the Botanics in Edinburgh or its three smaller satellite gardens (known as Regional Gardens) located in other parts of Scotland. These represent around 13,300 species from all over the world, or about 4% of all known plant species.

The RBGE Living Collection catalogue is available here and updated nightly.

Some notable collections at the botanic garden Edinburgh include:

- Alpine Plants
- Chinese Hillside
- Cryptogamic Garden
- The Glasshouses
  - Palmhouse
    - Temperate Palms
    - Tropical Palms
  - Orchids and Cycads
  - Ferns and Fossils
  - Plants and people (including Giant Water Lily pond)
  - Temperate lands
  - Rainforest Riches
  - Arid Lands
  - Montane tropical house (including Carnivorous plants)
  - Wet Tropical House
- Peat Walls
- The Queen Mother's memorial garden.
- Rock Garden
- Scottish Heath Garden
- Woodland Garden

=== Herbarium ===
The RBGE herbarium (situated in a purpose-built facility at the Edinburgh site) is considered a world-leading botanical collection, housing in excess of 3 million specimens. Prior to the formation of the Herbarium, plant collections tended to be the private property of the Regius Keeper. The Herbarium in its present form came with the fusion of the collections of the University of Edinburgh and the Botanical Society of Edinburgh in 1839–40. RBGE's Herbarium moved into its present, purpose-built home in 1964.

Over the years, a large number of collections have been added, belonging to individuals such as R.K. Greville and John Hutton Balfour, and institutions including the Universities of Glasgow, St Andrews and Hull. The most important historical collection is that of George Walker Arnott, which came with the University of Glasgow's foreign herbarium deposited on permanent loan in 1965. This collection contains specimens from all the major mid-19th century collectors, especially from India, North and South America, and South Africa, including type material of species described by 'Hooker & Arnott'. From the early 20th century, collections have been made by members of staff.

Approx a third of the herbarium is in a searchable database. The Index Herbariorum code assigned to the RBGE herbarium is E and it is used when citing housed specimens.

=== Library ===
RBGE's Library is Scotland's national reference collection for specialist botanical and horticultural resources. Housing around 70,000 books and 150,000 periodicals, the research library is one of the country's largest. It has been built up to support the specific subject fields researched and taught at RBGE. Garden staff and students are its main users, along with visiting researchers. However, as a national reference collection, the Library is also open to members of the public, either in person or by telephone or e-mail.

=== Inverleith House ===
Inverleith House is an 18th-century building, located centrally in the modern botanic gardens. From 1960 to 1984 it was the original base of the Scottish National Gallery of Modern Art, with exhibits in the house and in the gardens, before it moved to larger premises in Belford Road. Since then, Inverleith House has functioned as a contemporary art gallery, showing a programme of temporary exhibitions by invited artists. Its spring programmes feature works and specimens from the historical collections of the Botanics, together with exhibitions by modern and contemporary artists. The gallery is curated by the Royal Botanic Garden Edinburgh.

== Regional specialist gardens ==
=== Benmore ===
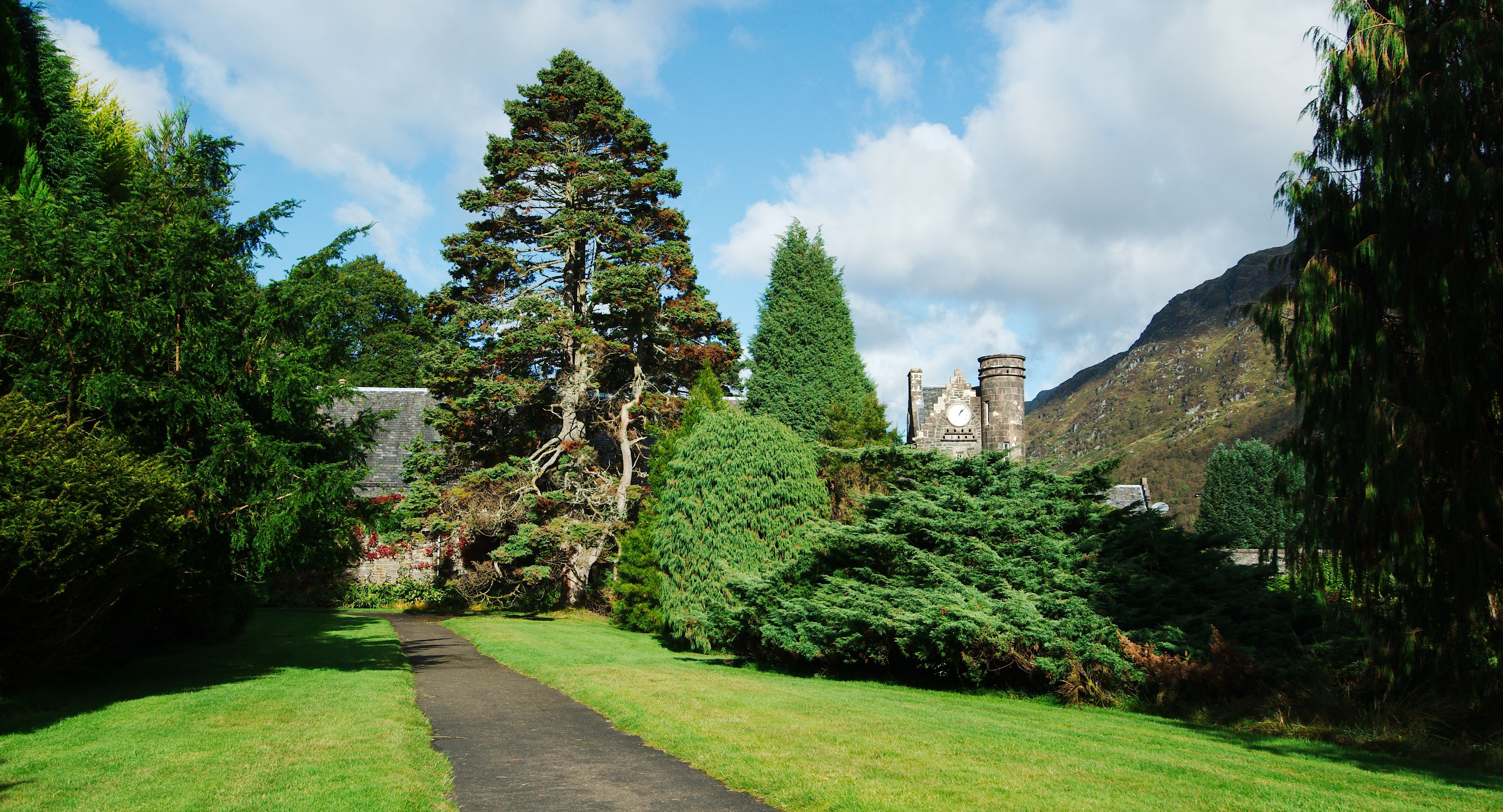
View of Benmore Botanic Garden

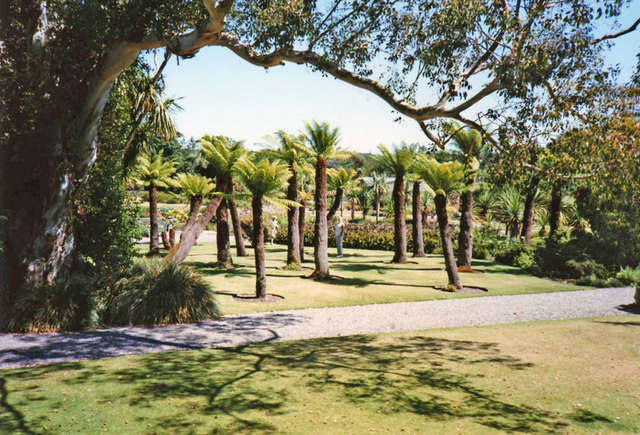
Tree ferns at Logan Botanic Garden

Situated on the West Coast of Scotland, Benmore Botanic Garden experiences a wetter and milder oceanic climate than the main site in Edinburgh. Benmore grows trees and shrubs from high rainfall areas, especially conifers and rhododendrons. Highlights of the collection include an avenue of Sequoiadendron and a recently refurbished Fernery, exhibiting rare ferns from both Britain and abroad.

=== Dawyck ===
Situated to the south of the Scottish Border town of Peebles, Dawyck Botanic Garden is particularly suitable for hardy plants from the world's cooler, drier areas. Dawyck is also renowned for its high diversity of fungi and cryptogamics.

=== Logan ===
Logan, Scotland's most exotic garden, has an almost sub-tropical climate, and provides ideal growing conditions for southern hemisphere plants.

== Royal Botanic Garden Edinburgh Medal ==
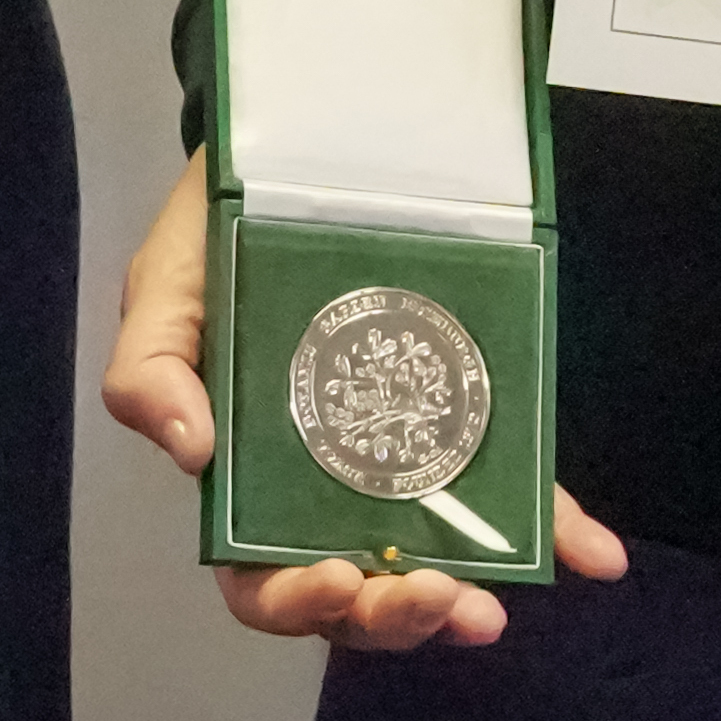
Royal Botanic Garden Edinburgh Medal

The Royal Botanic Garden Edinburgh Medal, instituted in 2010, is awarded from time to time to recognise an outstanding individual contribution in any field related to the work of the RBGE (either by a member of staff or by any other person). The medal, struck in silver, has a sibbaldia motif on one face and a portrait of Robert Sibbald on the other.

- 2010: Edward Kemp
- 2011: Sir Tim Smit
- 2013: Vernon H. Heywood
- 2015: Peter H. Raven
- 2018: Sanjeev K. Rai
- 2022: Jin Chen
- 2023: Sandra Díaz

== Gallery ==
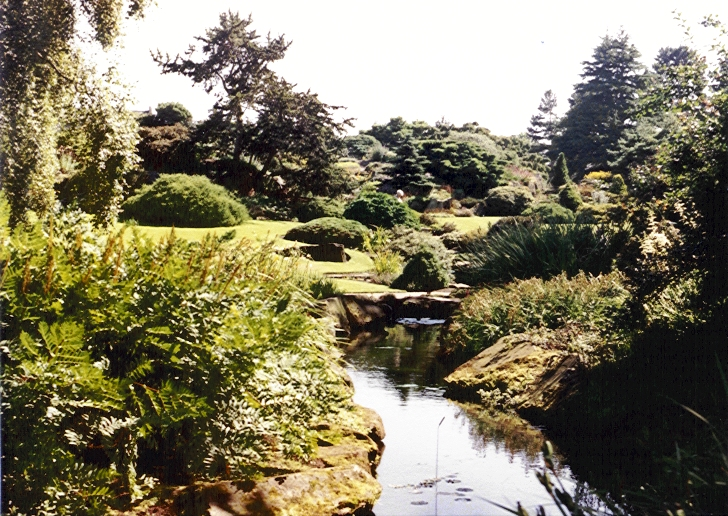
The Rock Garden, circa 1990

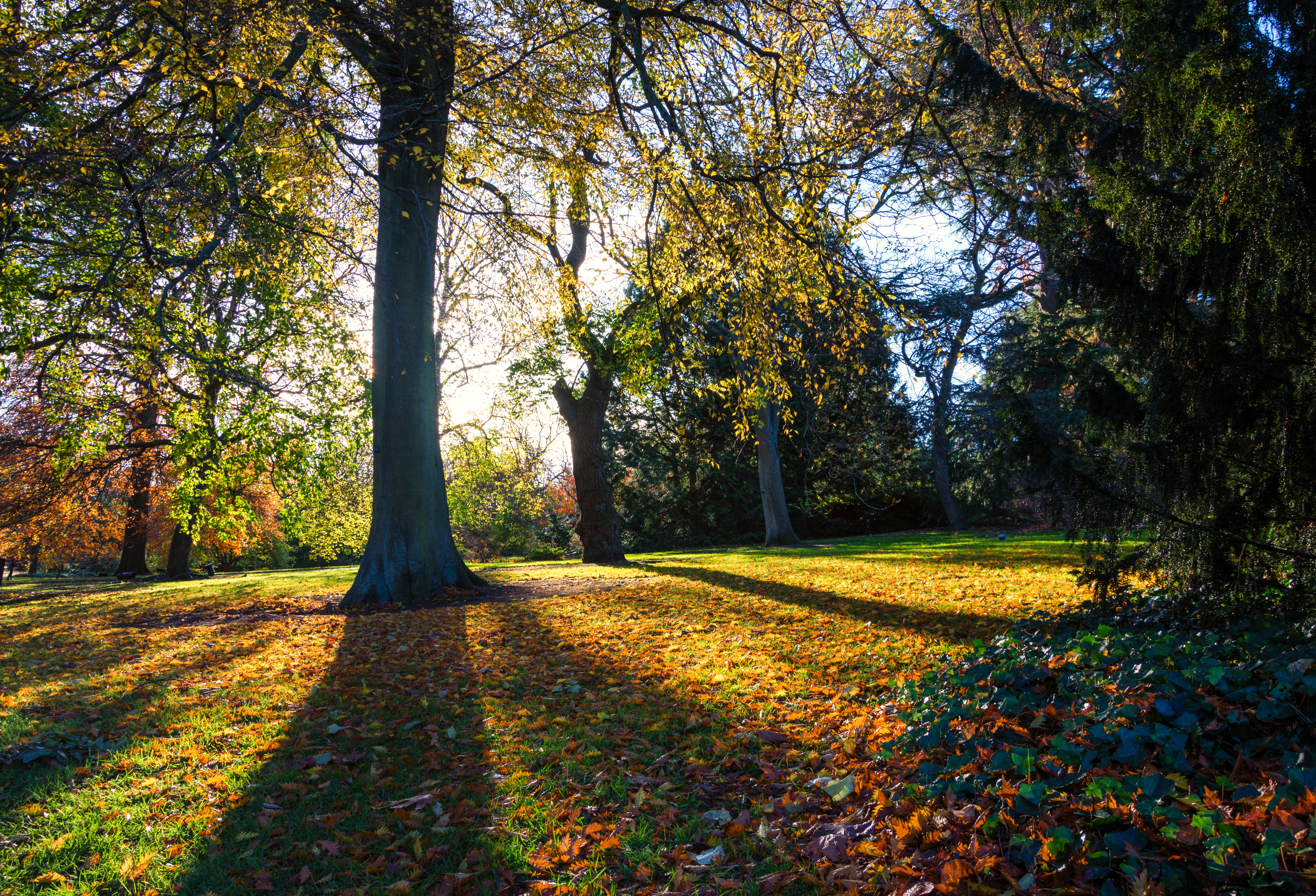
Trees in autumn

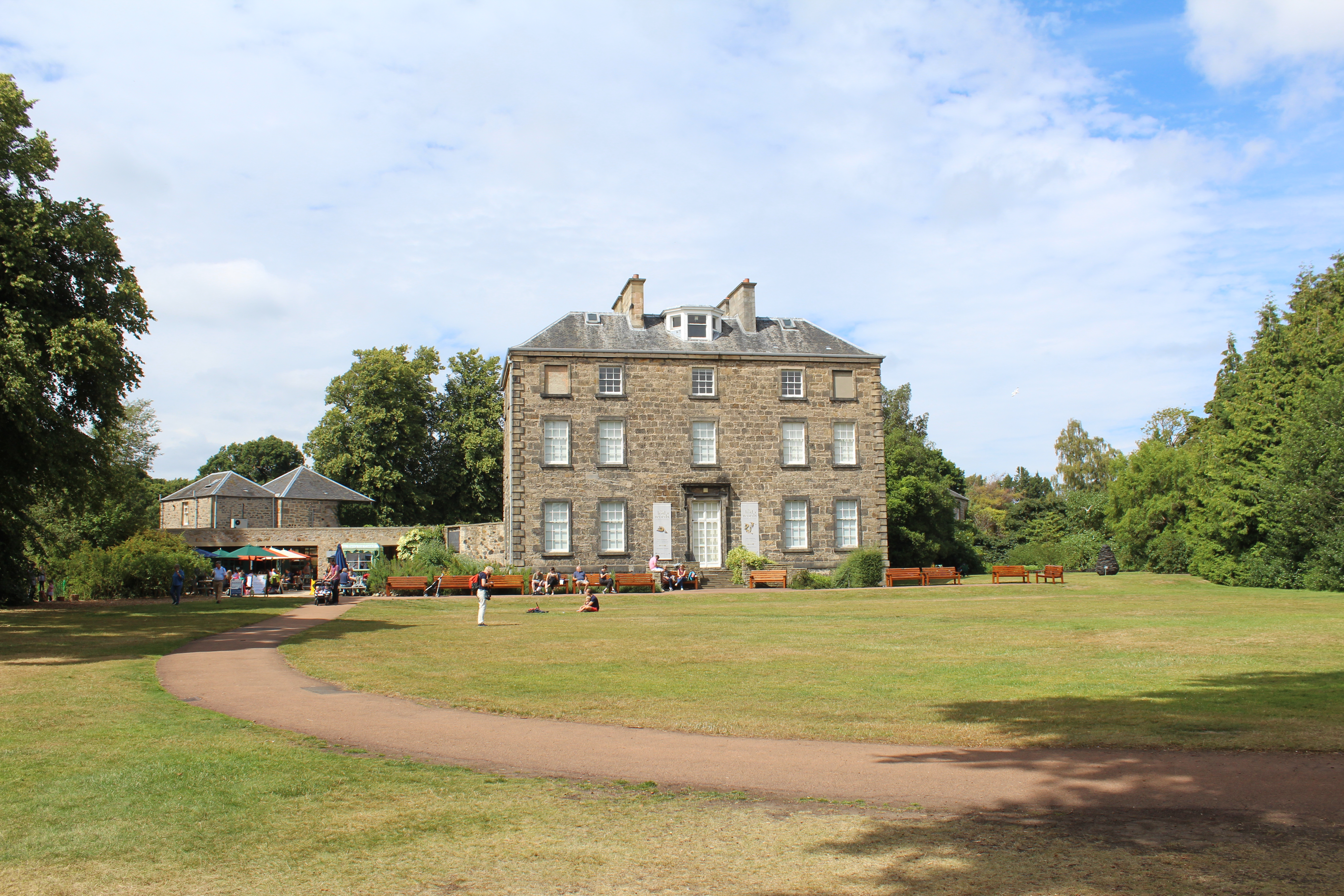
Inverleith House

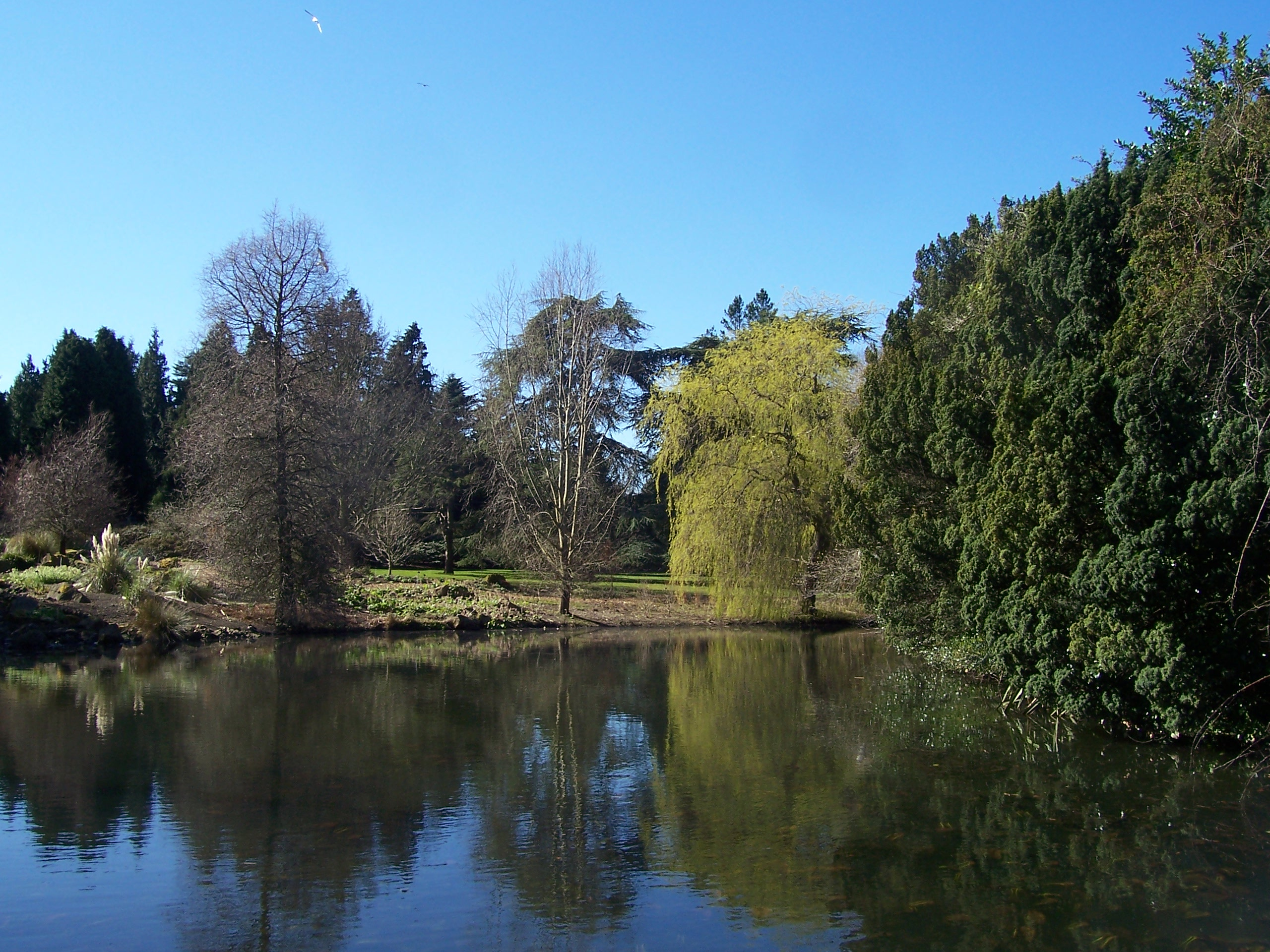
View of the pond

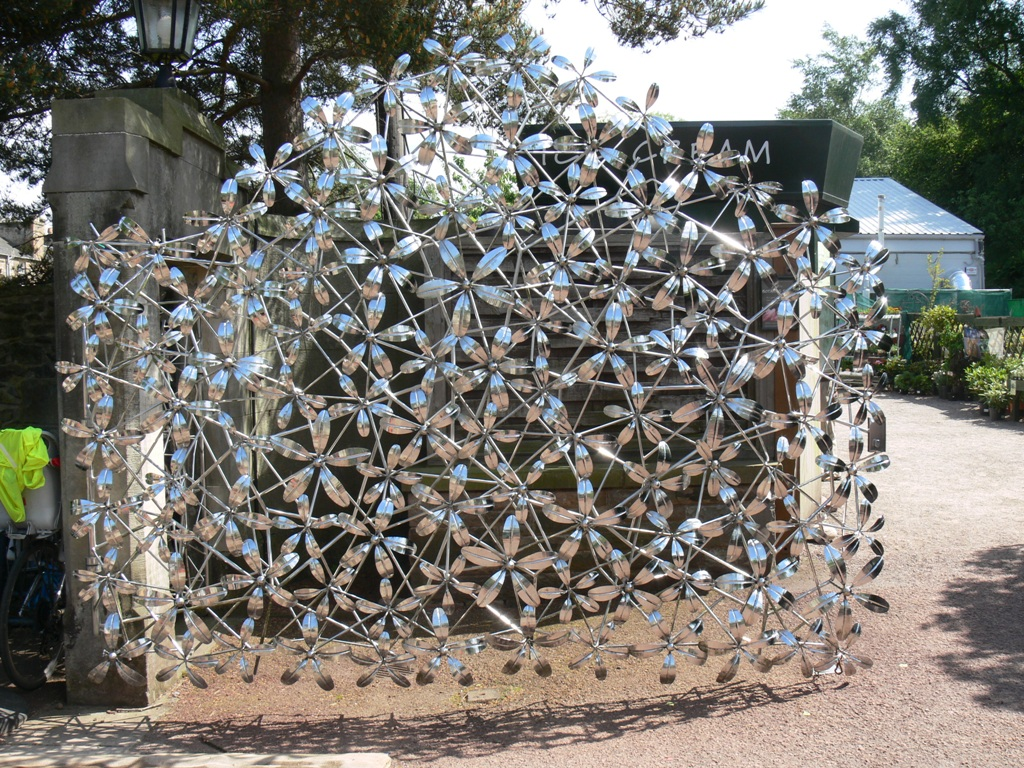
East Gate of the Garden

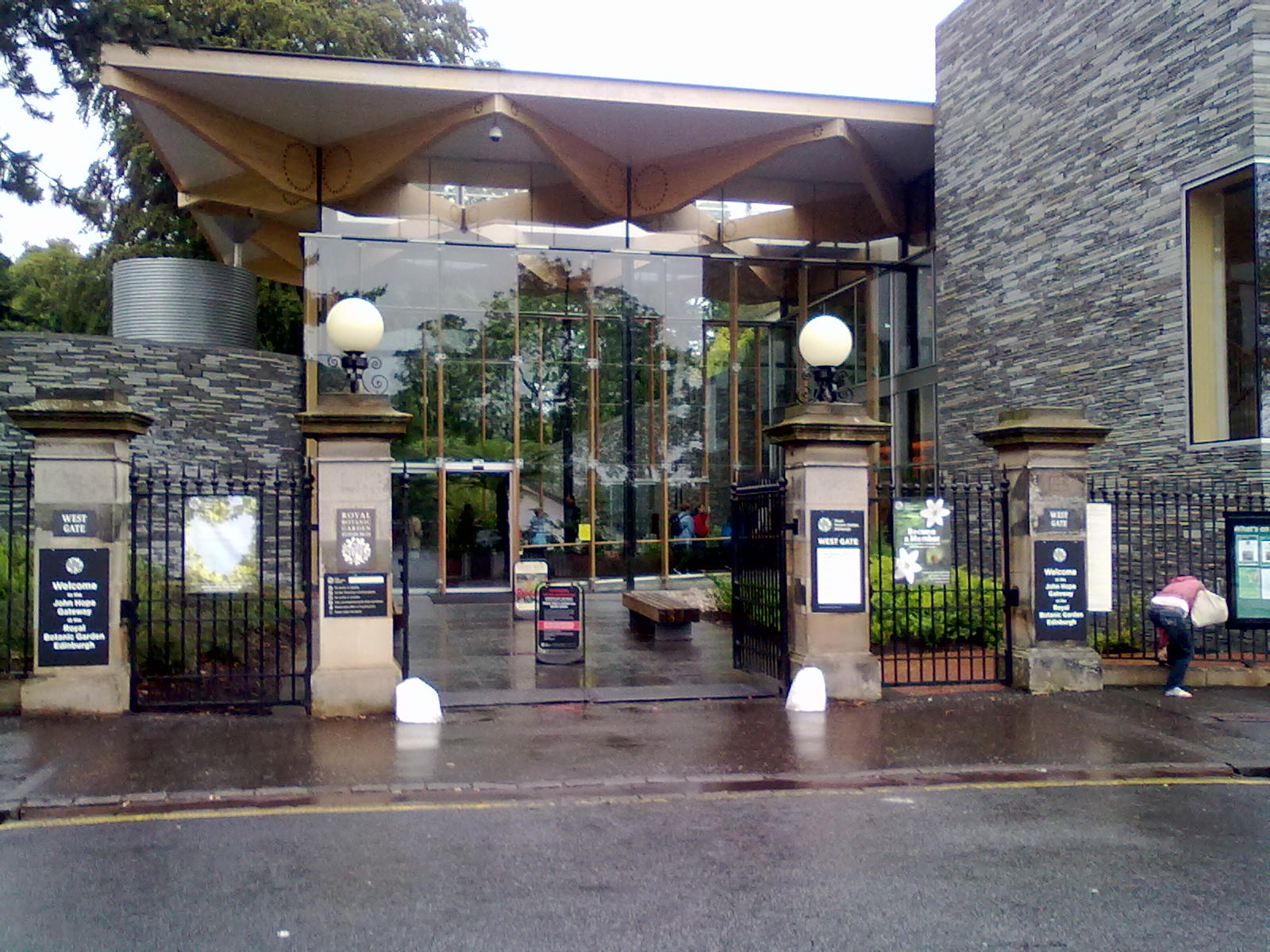
West Gate entrance to the Garden

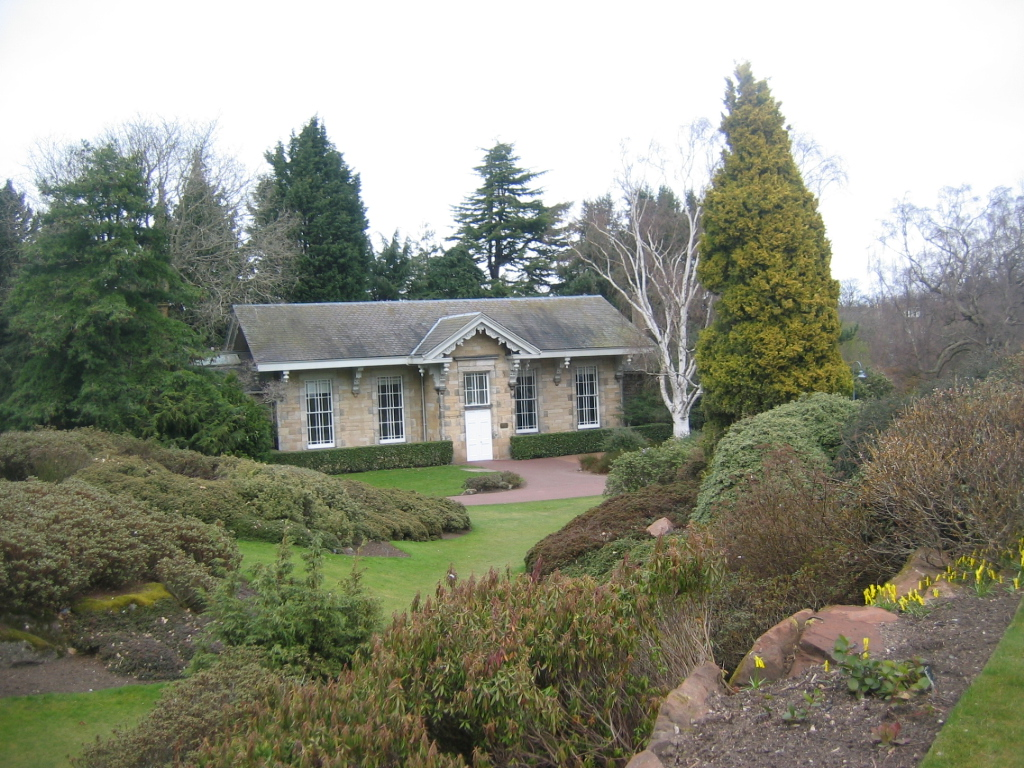
Caledonia Hall

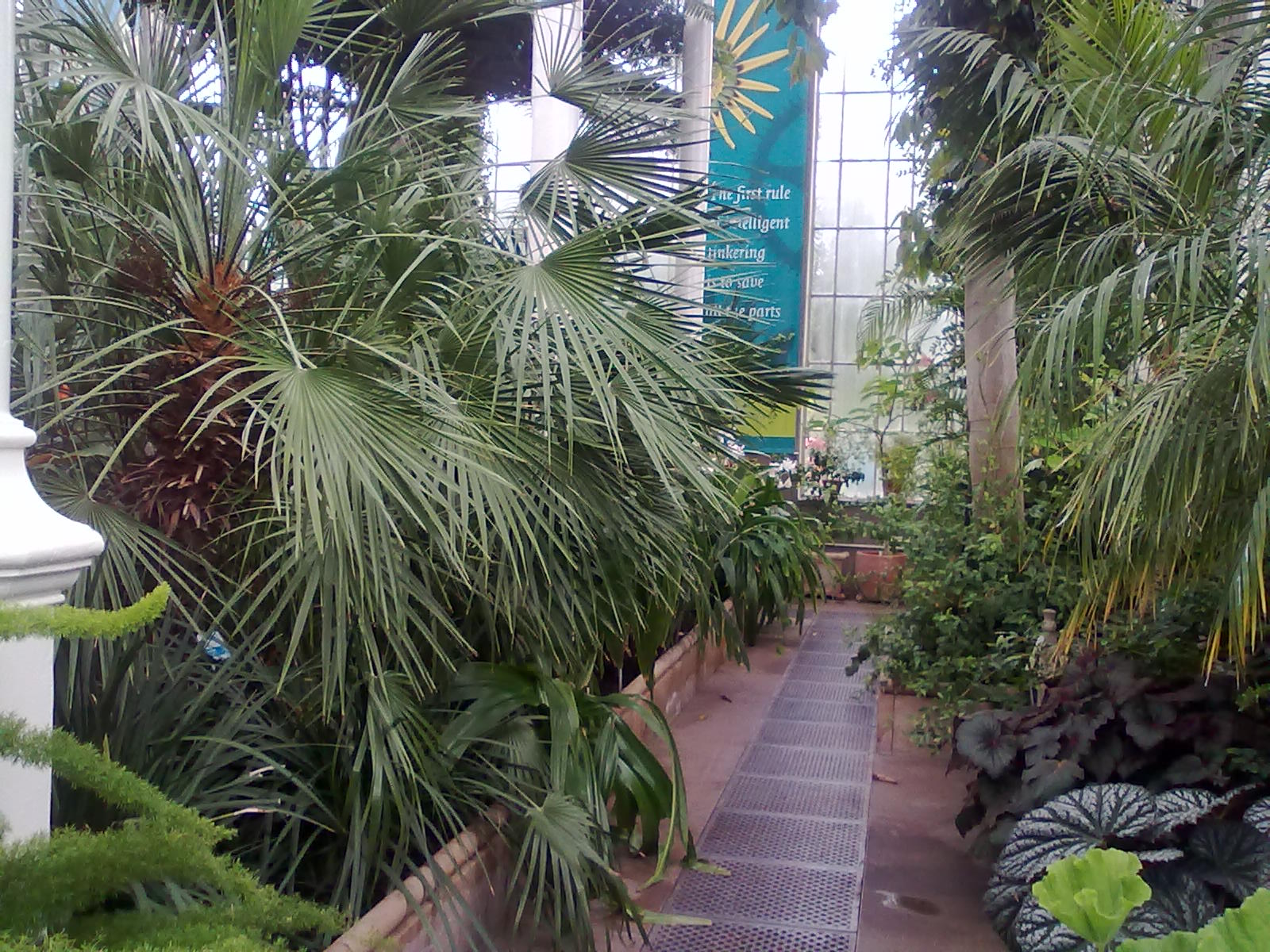
Interior of the Palm House

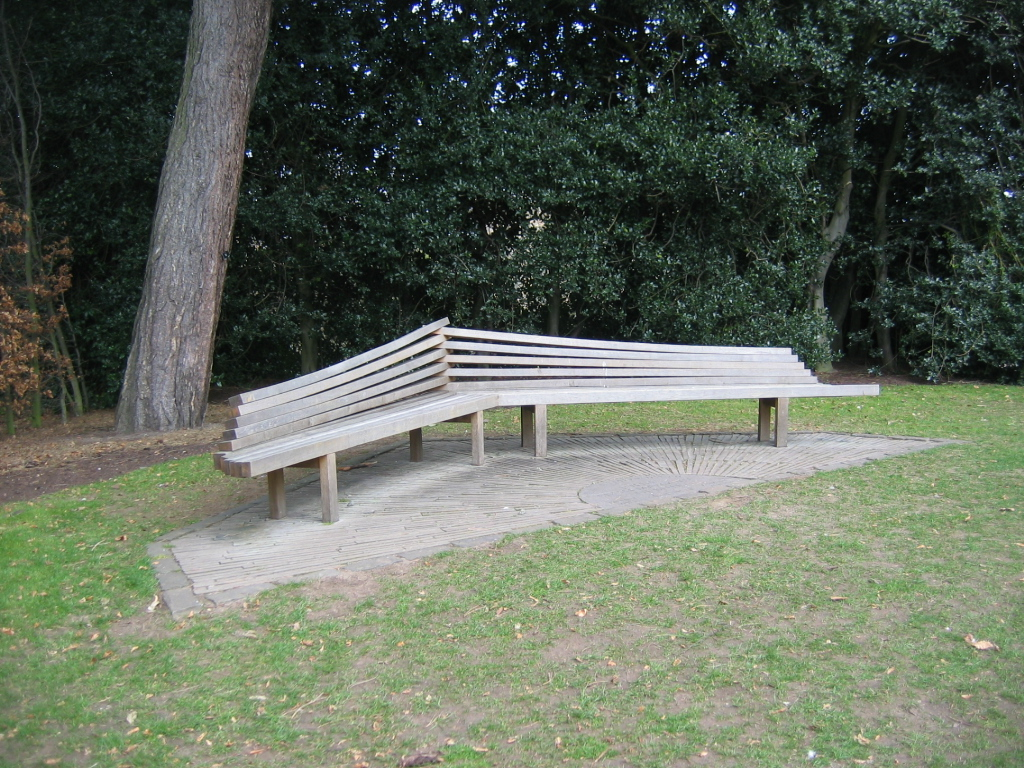
Seat in Edinburgh Botanics

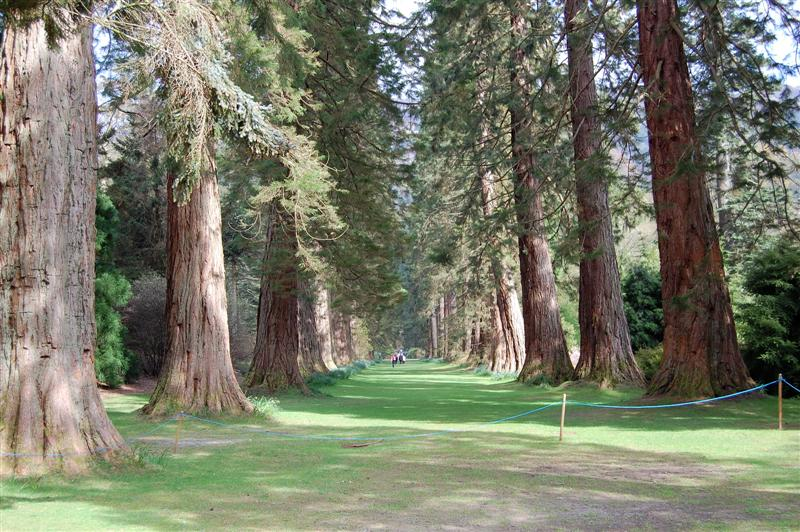
The avenue of Giant Redwoods at Benmore

== See also ==
- Royal Caledonian Horticultural Society
- DoCoMoMo Key Scottish Monuments
- Gardens in Scotland
- List of botanical gardens in the United Kingdom
- List of Category A listed buildings in Edinburgh
- List of post-war Category A listed buildings in Scotland
- Prospect 100 best modern Scottish buildings
