= Simon Milne =

16th Regius Keeper of the Royal Botanic Garden Edinburgh

Lieutenant Colonel Sir Simon Milne MBE FRSE FRGS

Regius Keeper of the Royal Botanic Garden Edinburgh
- In office 24 February 2014 – 31 January 2026
- Preceded by: Stephen Blackmore
- Succeeded by: Julia Knights

Personal details
- Born: Simon Stephen Milne; January 1959 (age 67)
- Spouse: Françoise Milne (m. 1993)
- Children: 3
- Education: University of St Andrews; Royal Naval College, Greenwich

Military service
- Allegiance: United Kingdom
- Branch/service: Royal Navy Marines
- Years of service: 1976–2000

Sir Simon Stephen Milne MBE FRSE FRGS (born January 1959) is a Royal Marines officer and conservationist who served as the 16th Regius Keeper of the Royal Botanic Garden Edinburgh between 2014 and 2026. In 2025, Milne was knighted for services to botany, conservation and horticulture.

== Early life and military career ==
Born in 1959, Milne was educated at the University of St Andrews and the Royal Naval College, Greenwich. He was commissioned into the Royal Marines in 1976 and served in Northern Ireland and Bosnia. He was appointed a member of the Order of the British Empire in 1996. He reached the rank of lieutenant colonel and was invalided in 2000. He was later made a member of Her Majesty's bodyguard of the Honourable Corps of Gentlemen at Arms in July 2011.

== Conservation career ==
Milne was director of the Sir Harold Hillier Gardens and Arboretum from 2000 to 2004 and chief executive of the Scottish Wildlife Trust from October 2004 until February 2014. Starting in 2007, he co-led the trial reintroduction of the European beaver to Scotland, with the Scottish Wildlife Trust working alongside the Royal Zoological Society of Scotland. He is the co-founder of the World Forum on Natural Capital and has specific interest and expertise in translocations, public engagement with the natural environment, biodiversity conservation and ecosystem-scale approach.

Milne was appointed the 16th Regius Keeper of the Royal Botanic Garden Edinburgh in February 2014, replacing botanist Stephen Blackmore. While in office, Milne oversaw several major developments at the garden, including the Edinburgh Biomes project, which involved moving thousands of adult plants, including big trees, and the complete renovation of the garden's most iconic glasshouse, the 19th-century Palm House. In January 2026, after over 10 years of service, he retired from his position and was succeeded by Professor Julia Knights. He is a fellow of the Royal Geographical Society and was conferred an honorary professor of the University of Edinburgh, associated with the School of Biological Sciences in January 2016. In 2021, Milne was appointed as a fellow of the Royal Society of Edinburgh. Right before his retirement, in December 2025, Milne was knighted in the 2026 New Year Honours for his services to botany, conservation and horticulture. His investiture took place shortly thereafter, in June 2026, at Windsor Castle, where he was dubbed a Knight Bachelor by His Majesty King Charles III.

Milne maintains active links with the botanical and conservation community as an Honorary Fellow of the Royal Botanic Garden Edinburgh, while continuing to advance research into the role of plants in history.

== Personal life ==
Milne married his wife Françoise in 1993 and the couple have three children together. Originally from France, she applied for dual-nationality following the 2016 EU referendum but her application was rejected, leading the couple to publicly criticise the uncertainty created by Brexit.
