= Charles Henry Alston (lawyer) =

American lawyer, civil rights leader (born 1873)

Charles Henry Alston (born September 16, 1873 – date of death unknown), also known as C. H. Alston, was an American lawyer, and civil rights leader in Tampa, Florida.

== Early life and education ==
Charles Henry Alston was born on September 16, 1873 in Raleigh, North Carolina, to parents Lydia and Deaton Alston. He graduated from Shaw University with a bachelor of science degree in 1891, and a bachelor of laws degree in 1894.

He was admitted to The Florida Bar that same year.

== Legal career ==
During his career, he became an attorney for the City Negro Board of Trade, participated in over 11,000 criminal cases, and raised a legal challenge to the exclusion of African Americans from Floridian juries. No case he was involved in led to a death sentence, and his constitutional challenge was successful. In 1906 Booker T. Washington identified him, alongside George W. Parker, and Isaac Lawrence Purcell as one of three African American lawyers in Pensacola, Florida, noting that their treatment by the bar was equal to that of their white colleagues.

== Political career ==
Alston became a political leader of Tampa’s African American community. He became a local county chairman, and became secretary to the Republican State Central Committee. He was sent as a delegate to the 1912 Republican National Convention. At this convention he led a group of Republican “bolters” supporting Teddy Roosevelt. He accused white Republicans of discrimination in choosing delegates, and his group produced its own list of delegates.

== Personal life ==
An Episcopalian, he also held numerous positions within a Freemasonry Grand Lodge.

Alston served as Hillsborough County's Supervisor of Negro Schools, and was a vice-president of the Florida Negro Business league. He was listed as one of the reliable lawyers in Tampa in The Central Law Journal in 1913.
