= James Sutherland (botanist) =

Scottish botanist (1638–1719)

James Sutherland (c. 1639–1719) was the first Professor of Physic (Botany) at the University of Edinburgh, from 1676 to 1705. He was intendant of the Physic Garden (later to evolve into the Royal Botanic Garden on a new site), and his innovative publication Hortus Medicus Edinburgensis placed Scotland at the forefront of European botany. He was also a renowned coin collector.

Although known for his abilities as a herbalist and his enthusiasm for plants, Sutherland was just a youth when first recruited by Dr (later Sir) Robert Sibbald and Dr (later Sir) Andrew Balfour to take care of their burgeoning plant collection. Initially this was at the Palace of Holyroodhouse garden, but in 1675, when land was acquired in the grounds of Trinity Hospital, over which Edinburgh Waverley station has now been built, Sutherland was appointed Intendant of the (Town) Physic Garden. Within eight years Sutherland had published a list of the 2000 or so plants grown in the latter garden, his "Hortus Medicus Edinburgensis", the first botanical work to be published in Scotland.

His prowess developed such that in 1695 the Town created a Chair of Botany for him, with responsibility for a further garden, the college (Physic) Garden, by Blackfriars. Of greater import was Sutherland's involvement, in the same year, with supervision of the King's Garden, part of the Royal Garden at Holyrood, where he cultivated vegetables and medicinal herbs. It was undoubtedly his impact in this role that led, on 12 January 1699, to the first Royal Warrant connected with Royal Botanic Garden Edinburgh, appointing him as the first Regius Keeper and first King's Botanist, in addition to his Professorship and the Keepership of three gardens.

In addition to his leadership of all things botanical in the city, Sutherland had a great reputation as an antiquary and numismatist, activities to which he chose to devote more time in the later part of his long life.

== Works ==
- Hortus Medicus Edinburgensis (1683)
