= Isaac Lawrence Purcell =

American lawyer

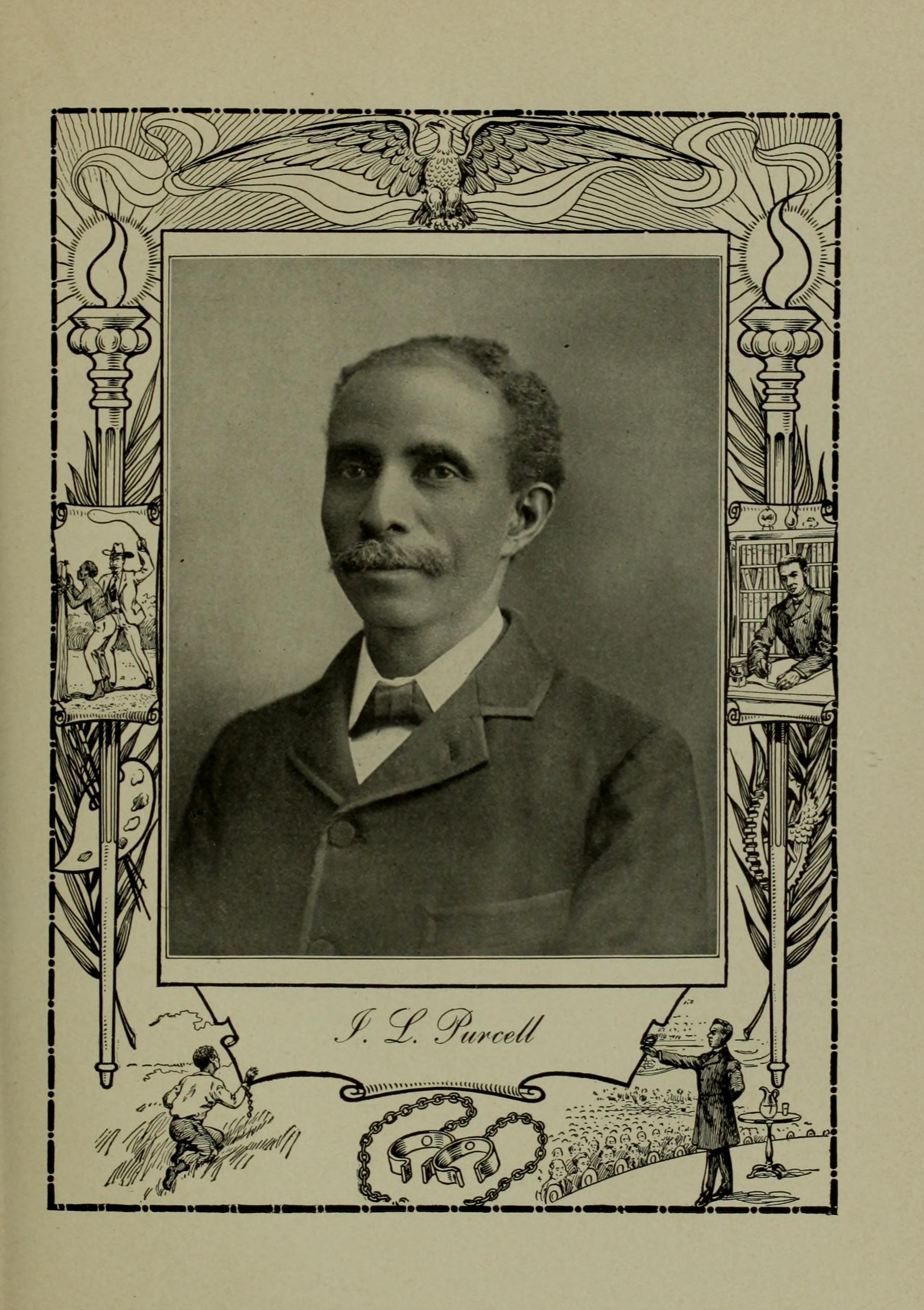
- Born: July 17, 1857; Winnsboro, South Carolina
- Occupation: American lawyer

Isaac Lawrence Purcell (born July 17, 1857) was an African-American lawyer. Booker T. Washington noted he was admitted to the bar of the United States Supreme Court and had cases before it. He worked in Jacksonville, Florida.

He was born in Winnsboro, South Carolina. His father John W. Purcell was a carpenter. He studied at the University of South Carolina after it was desegregated but was excluded after segregation was restored and studied the law privately in Palatka, Florida. He was an active Republican and attended party conventions.

He and attorney J. Douglas Wetmore challenged the law segregating streetcars in Florida as unconstitutional. The Avery Law was invalidated. It was one of the only wins against segregation laws during the Jim Crow era and attempts to expand its reach were not successful as the same court ruled that there was equality in other instances of segregation where blacks served blacks and white served whites. He represented the Union Aid Association of America.
