= Douglas Mackay Henderson =

Scottish botanist (1927–2007)

Douglas Mackay Henderson CBE FRSE FLS (30 August 1927 – 10 November 2007) was a Scottish botanist, the 12th Regius Keeper of the Royal Botanic Garden Edinburgh from 1970 to 1987.

== Life ==
He was born in Blairgowrie on 30 August 1927, the second son of Captain Frank Morrison Henderson of the Ben Line, and his wife, Adine Cornfoot Mackay. His grandfather was a banker in Edinburgh. His father served with the Merchant Navy in both World Wars.

He was educated at Blairgowrie High School (1932–1944) and then studied Botany at the University of Edinburgh. his influential tutors included William Wright Smith, Malcolm Wilson and Harold Fletcher and he graduated with first class honours in 1948.

He worked at the Molteno Institute for Research in Parasitology in Cambridge, studying methods of plant virology, before joining the Department of Agriculture for Scotland in 1948 at their research establishment at East Craigs, Edinburgh. In 1951 he moved to the Royal Botanic Garden Edinburgh (RBGE) as a Scientific Officer, becoming Principal Scientific Officer in 1961.

After overseeing expansion of the herbarium and the library, he took sabbatical leave, sponsored by the US Atomic Authority, to work on pollen structure in Solna, Stockholm. There his work introduced him to poppies in the genus Meconopsis and led to a seminal paper on the pollen of the constituent members. He was also able to study the morphology and structure of rust fungi spores. Henderson later introduced the first electron microscope to the RBGE.

In 1966 he was elected a Fellow of the Royal Society of Edinburgh. His proposers were Harold Fletcher, Robert Brown, J A MacDonald, and Paul Weatherley. From 1969 to 1981 he was Secretary of the International Association of Botanical Gardens.

In 1970 he was appointed the 12th Regius Keeper of the RBGE, a position he held until 1987. During his tenure he expanded and diversified the role of the RBGE, expanding the educational facilities, and, in 1979, overseeing the transfer of the Dawyck Botanic Garden in Peeblesshire into its care. From 1969 to 1981 he served as Secretary of the newly formed International Association of Botanical Gardens, which comprised some 1500 organisations. He was appointed CBE in the 1985 Birthday Honours.

In 1983 Edinburgh University awarded him an honorary professorship. In 1987 he was appointed Queen's Botanist in Scotland.

On his retirement in 1987 he accepted the post of Administrator at Inverewe Garden, Wester Ross for the National Trust for Scotland. He held this post until 1992, also organising social events at Inverewe House.

From 1995 he was Secretary of the Highland branch of Help the Aged.

He died in 2007.

== Family ==
He married Julia Margaret Brown of Belfast in 1952n at Cawthorne in Yorkshire. They had a son, Neil Henderson, and two daughters, Barbara and Jennifer.

Douglas's elder brother was the geologist Frank Paterson Henderson. His younger brother was the zoologist, Andrew Ernest Henderson.

== Publications ==
- British Rust Fungi (with Malcolm Wilson)
- British Fungus Flora: Agarics and Boleti

== Botanical Reference ==
The standard author abbreviation D.M.Hend. is used to indicate this person as the author when citing a botanical name.

== Honours and awards ==
- Fellow of the Royal Society of Edinburgh
- 1964 Elected President of Botanical Society of Edinburgh
- 1971 Patrick Neill Prize of the Royal Caledonian Horticultural Society
- 1975 Elected President of the British Mycological Society
- 1981 Scottish Horticultural Medal
- 1985 Willendow Medal from the Berlin Botanic Garden
- 1985 Victoria Medal of Honour from the Royal Horticultural Society
- 1985 CBE
- 1989 Bicentenary Medal of the Royal Society of Edinburgh
