= John McNeill (botanist) =

British-Canadian botanist (born 1933)

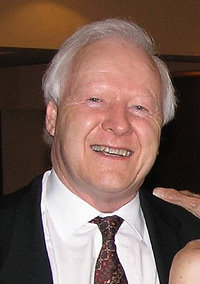
- McNeill in 2006
- Born: 15 September 1933 (age 93); Edinburgh

John McNeill (born 15 September 1933) is a British and Canadian botanist and museum director who has worked particularly on the plant order Caryophyllales. In 1960, he received a Ph.D. from the University of Edinburgh for his thesis on “Taxonomic studies in the Alsinoideae”. As a nomenclature specialist, he has provided editorial guidance for journals and book series, and has served as a member of the Editorial Committee of the International Code of Botanical Nomenclature and the International Code of Nomenclature for algae, fungi, and plants since the XIII International Botanical Congress in 1981. He has served as Vice-rapporteur and Rapporteur-general for several botanical congresses, including at Melbourne (2011). As an editor for the journal Taxon, he is involved with assessing proposals to conserve and reject botanical names.

== Career summary ==
- 1957–1961 he was successively lecturer and associate lecturer in agricultural botany at the University of Reading
- 1961–1969, lecturer at the University of Liverpool.
- 1969–1981, Plant Research Institute of Agriculture Canada
- 1981–1987, professor of biology at the University of Ottawa
- 1987–1989, 'Regius Keeper' (director) of the Royal Botanic Garden Edinburgh as successor to Douglas Mackay Henderson and predecessor to David S. Ingram
- 1989, Associate Director of the Royal Ontario Museum in Toronto (Canada). In this position he was in charge of the collections and research
- 1990–1991, Executive Director of the Royal Ontario Museum
- 1990–1999, professor of botany at the University of Toronto
- 1991–1995, Director of the Royal Ontario Museum
- 1995–1997, Director and President of the Royal Ontario Museum

Since his retirement in 1999, Dr McNeill has served as Director Emeritus of the Royal Ontario Museum. Since 1998 he has been an honorary research associate at the Royal Botanic Garden Edinburgh. He is involved in the Flora of North America, acting as an editor, writer, and as a consultant on matters of botanical nomenclature related to the project. He was President of the International Organization for Plant Information. For the Flora of China he contributed to the descriptions of the families Caryophyllaceae and Polygonaceae.

McNeill was the (co-) author of more than sixty botanical names. He is a member of the American Society of Plant Taxonomists and he serves on the editorial board of Edinburgh Journal of Botany.
