= Charles Alston (botanist) =

Scottish botanist (1683–1760)

- Born: 1683; Hamilton, Lanarkshire, Scotland
- Died: 22 November 1760 (aged 76–77); Edinburgh, Scotland
- Scientific career
- Fields: Botany

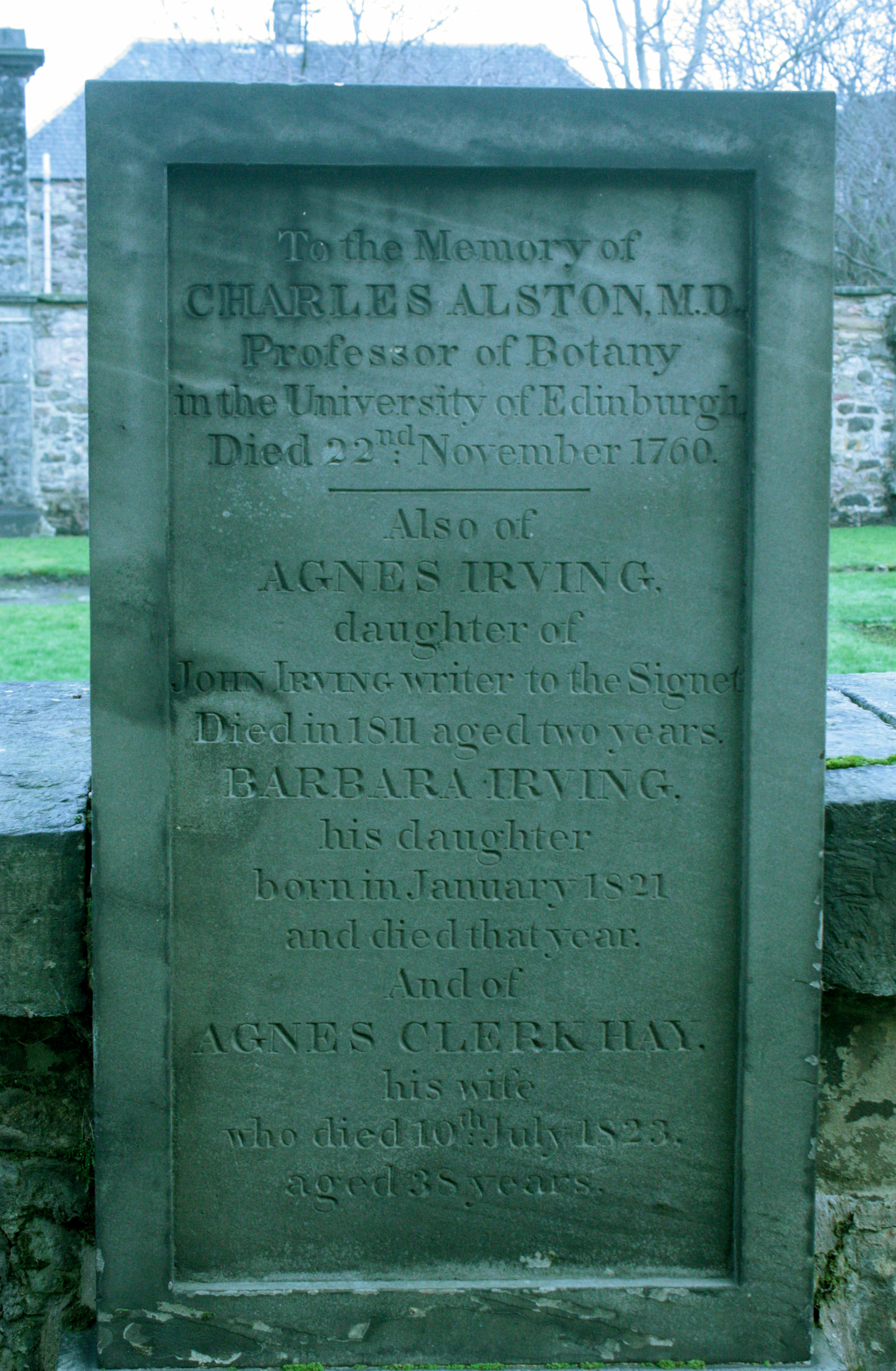
The grave of Charles Alston, Canongate Kirkyard, Edinburgh

Charles Alston (1683 – 22 November 1760) was a Scottish botanist.

== Career ==
Alston was born in Hamilton, Lanarkshire, and was apparently raised by the Duke and Duchess of Hamilton.

In 1715 he went to Leyden to study under the Dutch physician Hermann Boerhaave. On his return to Scotland he became lecturer in materia medica and botany at Edinburgh and also superintendent of the botanical gardens. He was a critic of Linnaeus's system of plant classification.

He was appointed Regius Keeper of the Royal Botanic Garden Edinburgh in 1716, holding the position until 1760.

== Family ==
He married first Robina Lockhart. Issue-

Robina born 21 Jun 1731 in Canongate who married in Edinburgh on 6 Jan 1754 to Alexander Birnie, of Bromhill, b 1708 d before 1770

On 3 October 1741 he married (secondly) in Canongate Kirk Bethia Birnie (b. 1706) daughter of John Birnie, of Broomhill.

He is buried in Canongate Kirkyard on the Royal Mile in Edinburgh, immediately east of the church.

Upon his death, his significant library was auctioned in Edinburgh.

== Botanical recognition ==
The tree genus Alstonia is named after him.
