= Harold Fletcher (botanist) =

English botanist and horticulturalist

Harold Roy Fletcher, FRSE (14 April 1907 – 27 August 1978) was an English botanist and horticulturist. He was Regius Keeper of the Royal Botanic Garden, Edinburgh, from 1956 to 1970 and Her Majesty's Botanist from 1966 to 1978. As an author, he is known as H.R. Fletcher.

== Life ==
He was born in Glossop in Derbyshire on 14 April 1907 the son of James Fletcher. He attended Glossop Grammar School. He attended the University of Manchester graduating with a BSc in 1929. He then undertook postgraduate studies at the University of Aberdeen gaining a doctorate (PhD) in 1933.

In 1943 he was elected a Fellow of the Royal Society of Edinburgh. His proposers were Sir William Wright Smith, James R Matthews, James Ritchie and James Couper Brash. He served as the Society's Vice President 1962 to 1965 and won their Neill Prize for the period 1971-73.

From 1951 to 1954 he was Director of the Royal Horticultural Society at Wisley. In 1954 he became Assistant Keeper at the Royal Botanic Garden in Edinburgh and was promoted to be the 11th Regius Keeper in 1956, holding the post until 1970.

The University of Edinburgh and the University of St Andrews both awarded him honorary doctorates (DSc) in 1971.

He died on 27 August 1978.

== Publications ==
The standard author abbreviation H.R.Fletcher is used to indicate this person as the author when citing a botanical name.

- New Species of Alpine Primula (1941)
- Challenges and Opportunity (1966)
- The Story of the Royal Horticultural Society 1804-1968 (1969)
- Royal Botanic Garden, Edinburgh 1670-1970 (1970)
- Quest of Flowers (1975)
- The Genus Primula (1977)

== Family ==
In 1941 he married Evelyn Betty Veronica Sloan.
