= Electronic Money Institution =

Financial institution providing electronic payment services

An Electronic Money Institution (EMI) is a financial institution that is authorised to issue electronic money and provide payment services such as domestic and international electronic funds transfers and can provide bank accounts and e-wallets. EMIs are similar to banks except they are not allowed to lend money.

EMIs are generally licensed by the same government organisation that issues banking licenses, in most countries that is the central bank or equivalent government agency. They are used by fintech based challenger banks and similar disruptors that are competing against traditional banks for payment services.

== History ==
The concept was developed in 2009 by the European Union (EU) and the term was created as part of the EU's E-Money Directive (Directive 2009/110/EC) and has since spread to other countries. The term encompasses financial firms that provide payment services and bank account but don't have a full banking license.

== Licensing and regulations ==
In the European Union, an Electronic Money Institution can be licensed in any country member but can act and provide services in all EU and EEA countries. The legal basis for e-money issuance in the European Union is covered by EU Directive 2009/110/EC, on the taking up, pursuit and prudential supervision of the business of electronic money institutions establishes, issued by the European Parliament and Council 16 September 2009. Electronic Money Institutions can provide a wide range of payment services, such as issuing bank accounts with IBANs, payment cards, e-wallets and other payment instruments requiring the storage of client's funds. The funds received by EMIs may not be protected under the Financial Services Compensation Scheme (FSCS) depending on the country but EMIs are required to safeguard them either via segregation in dedicated accounts or by covering them with insurance.

Countries beyond the EU have adopted rules to encourage novel entities to provide cost effective low value digital payment instruments to aid in digitizing different types of payments.

== See also ==
- Electronic Money Association
- Neobank
- Non-bank financial institution
- Payment processor
- Payment service provider
- Payment Services Directive
