= Our Lady's High School =

Our Lady's High School may refer to:

- Our Lady's High School, Broxburn, West Lothian, Scotland
- Our Lady's High School, Cumbernauld, North Lanarkshire, Scotland
- Our Lady's High School, Motherwell, North Lanarkshire, Scotland
- Our Lady's Catholic High School, Fulwood, Lancashire, England
- Our Lady's Catholic High School, Stamford Hill, London, England

== See also ==
- Our Lady's Secondary School (disambiguation)
