= Big Four (World War I) =

Four top allied powers

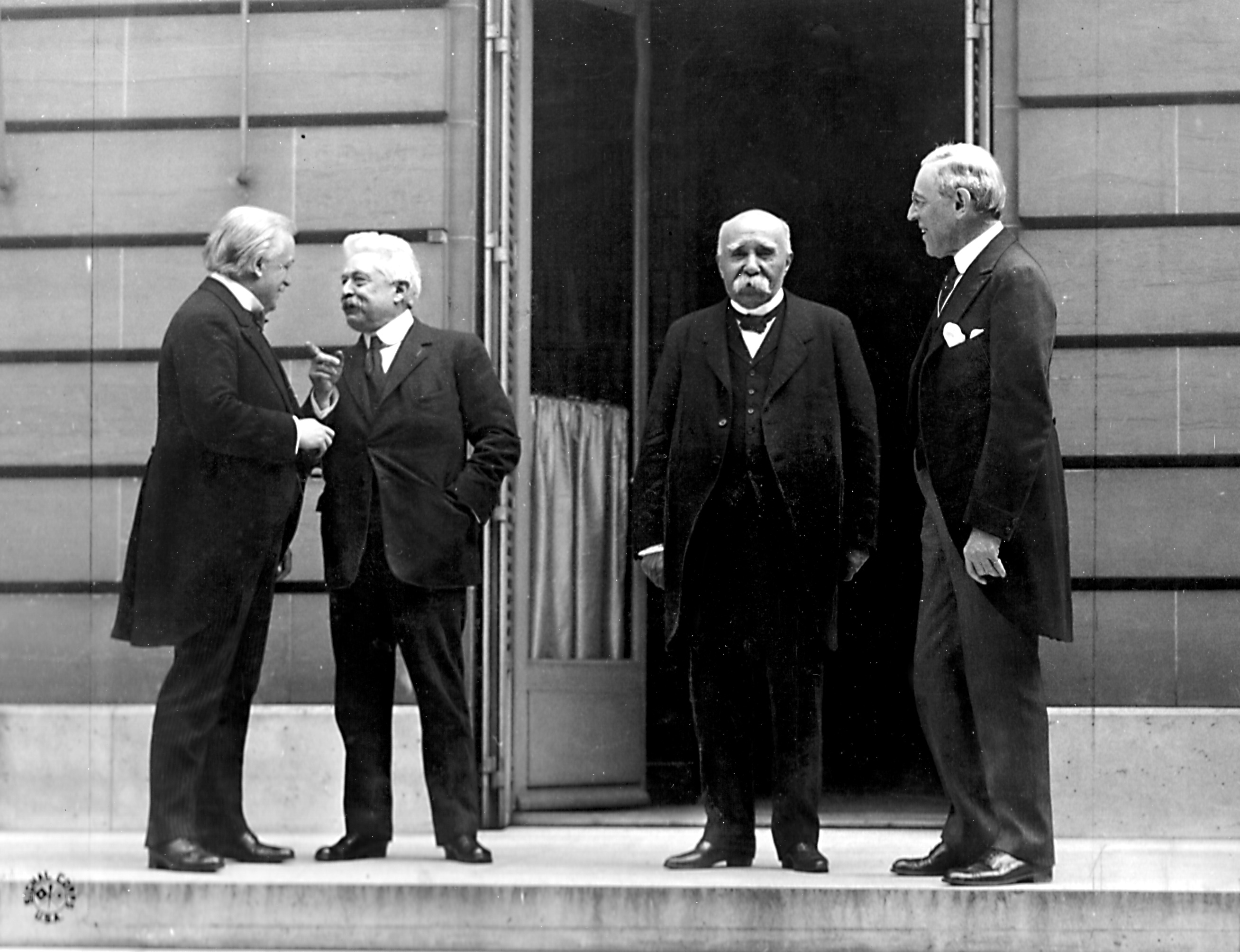
The Council of Four from left to right: David Lloyd George, Vittorio Emanuele Orlando, Georges Clemenceau and Woodrow Wilson at the Hôtel de Crillon in Paris.

The Big Four or the Four Nations refer to the four top Allied powers of World War I and their leaders who met at the Paris Peace Conference in January 1919. The Big Four is also known as the Council of Four. It was composed of Georges Clemenceau of France, David Lloyd George of the United Kingdom, Vittorio Emanuele Orlando of Italy, and Woodrow Wilson of the United States.

Among the Big Four, only Clemenceau could speak and understand both English and French. Orlando did not know English, while Lloyd George and Wilson did not know French. Therefore Orlando and Wilson had no direct means of communication.

== Georges Clemenceau ==
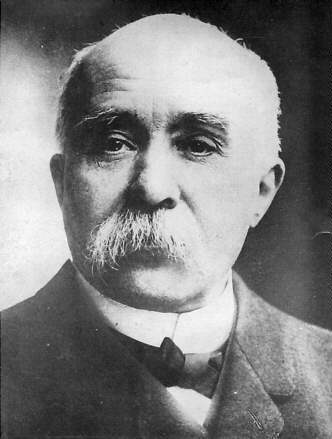
Georges Clemenceau, Prime Minister of France

Georges Benjamin Clemenceau (French pronunciation: [ʒɔʁʒ klemɑ̃so]; 28 September 1841 – 24 November 1929) was a French politician, physician, and journalist. He served as the Prime Minister of France from 1906 to 1909, and again from 1917 to 1920. He is commonly nicknamed "Le Tigre" (The Tiger) and "Père-la-Victoire" (Father Victory) for his determination as a wartime leader.

Succeeding Paul Painlevé as premier in November 1917, Clemenceau formed a coalition cabinet in which he was also minister of war. He renewed the dispirited morale of France, persuaded the allies to agree to a unified command, and pushed the war vigorously until the final victory. Leading the French delegation at the Paris Peace Conference, Clemenceau insisted on Germany's disarmament and was never satisfied with the Versailles Treaty. He was the main antagonist of Woodrow Wilson, whose ideas he viewed as "too idealistic." For nearly the final year of World War One, he led France and was one of the major voices behind the Treaty of Versailles at the Paris Peace Conference (1919) in the aftermath of the war. Clemenceau was hoping that there would be more punishment put on Germany after they lost.

== David Lloyd George ==
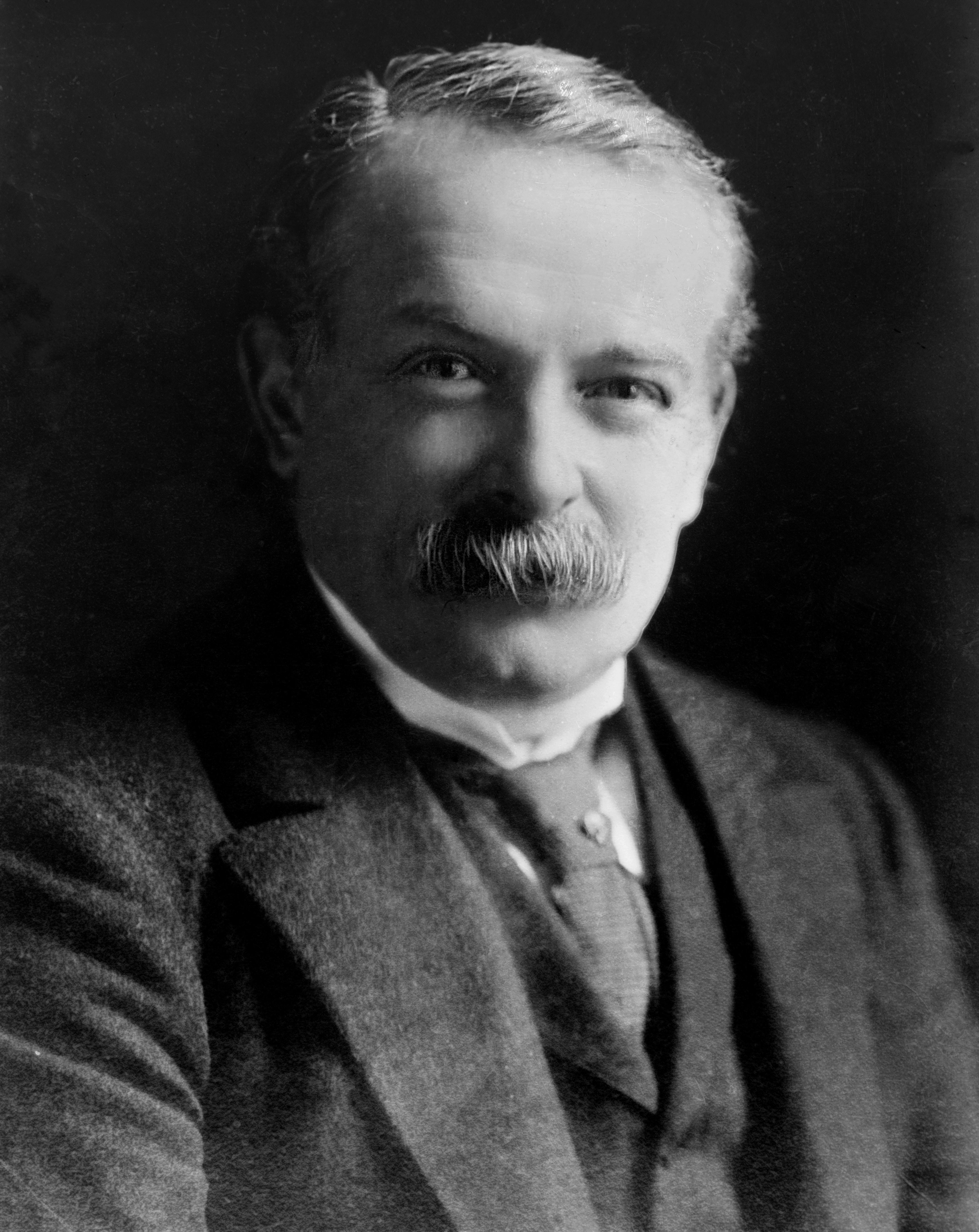
David Lloyd George, former Prime Minister of the United Kingdom

David Lloyd George, (17 January 1863 – 26 March 1945) from the British Liberal Party, was a highly effective leader of the coalition government that took power in late 1916 and managed the British war effort. However his coalition premiership was supported more by Conservatives than by his own Liberals, and the subsequent split was a key factor in the decline of the Liberal Party as a serious political force.

He won by a landslide in the election of 1918, held just after the war ended, where he spoke out for harsh terms against Germany. However, he was much more moderate in Paris. Unlike Clemenceau and Orlando, Lloyd George did not want to destroy the German economy and political system—as Clemenceau demanded—with massive reparations. When asked how he had done at the peace conference, he commented, "Not badly, considering I was seated between Jesus Christ and Napoleon [Wilson and Clemenceau]."

It has been said that "Lloyd George was the most affable and the most resilient, and he was probably the best at negotiating". In an article from the New York Times, it says that "Lloyd George was a pragmatist determined to protect and expand the interests of the British Empire."

== Vittorio Emanuele Orlando ==
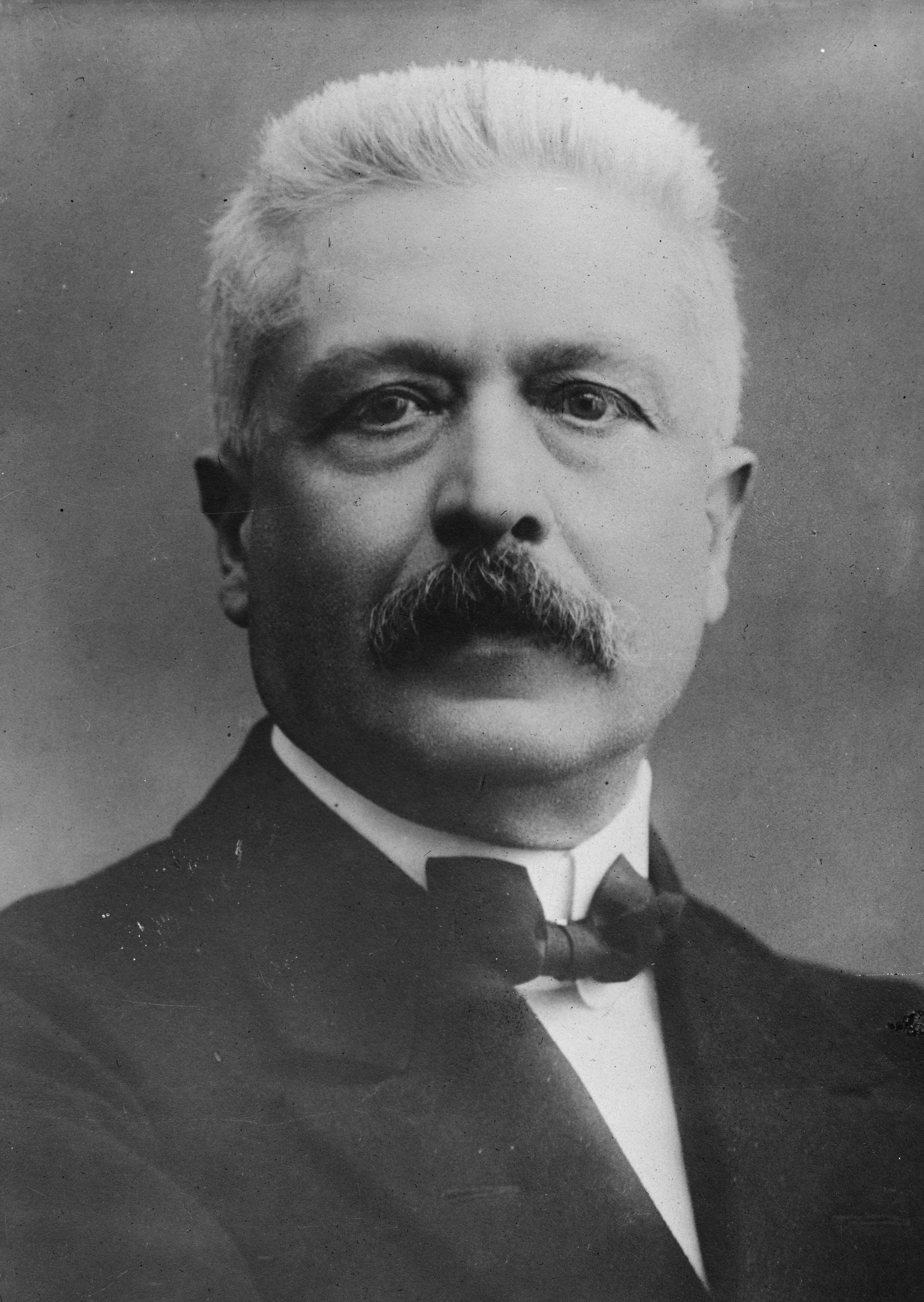
Vittorio Emanuele Orlando, Prime Minister of Italy

Vittorio Emanuele Orlando (19 May 1860 – 1 December 1953) was an Italian diplomat and political figure. He was born in Palermo, Sicily, and taught law. He is commonly nicknamed "The Premier of Victory".

In 1897 he was elected in the Italian Chamber of Deputies (Italian: Camera dei Deputati) for the district of Partinico for which he was constantly re-elected until 1925. He aligned himself with Giovanni Giolitti, who was Prime Minister of Italy five times between 1892 and 1921.

As Prime Minister of Italy, he went to the Paris Peace Conference in 1919. He demanded the fulfilment of the "secret" Treaty of London of 1915, by which Britain and France had promised Italy ample territorial compensation for its entry into World War I. Wilson agreed to the Italian annexation of Trento, South Tyrol, Trieste and Istria, but opposed the Italian annexation of Dalmatia. Clashing with Wilson, Orlando left the Peace Conference. However, he returned after a short period and concluded the negotiations. The so-called "mutilated victory" was used as propaganda by Gabriele d'Annunzio and played a role in the rise of Benito Mussolini. Opposing Fascism, Orlando gave up (1925) his seat in parliament and devoted himself to teaching and writing."

Aside from his prominent political role, Orlando is also known for his writings, over a hundred works, on legal and judicial issues; Orlando was himself a professor of law.

He was among the fathers of the Republican Constitution, being a member of the Constitutional Assembly also as speaker of the house. He was a candidate to be the first Italian President elected by the Parliament.

== Woodrow Wilson ==
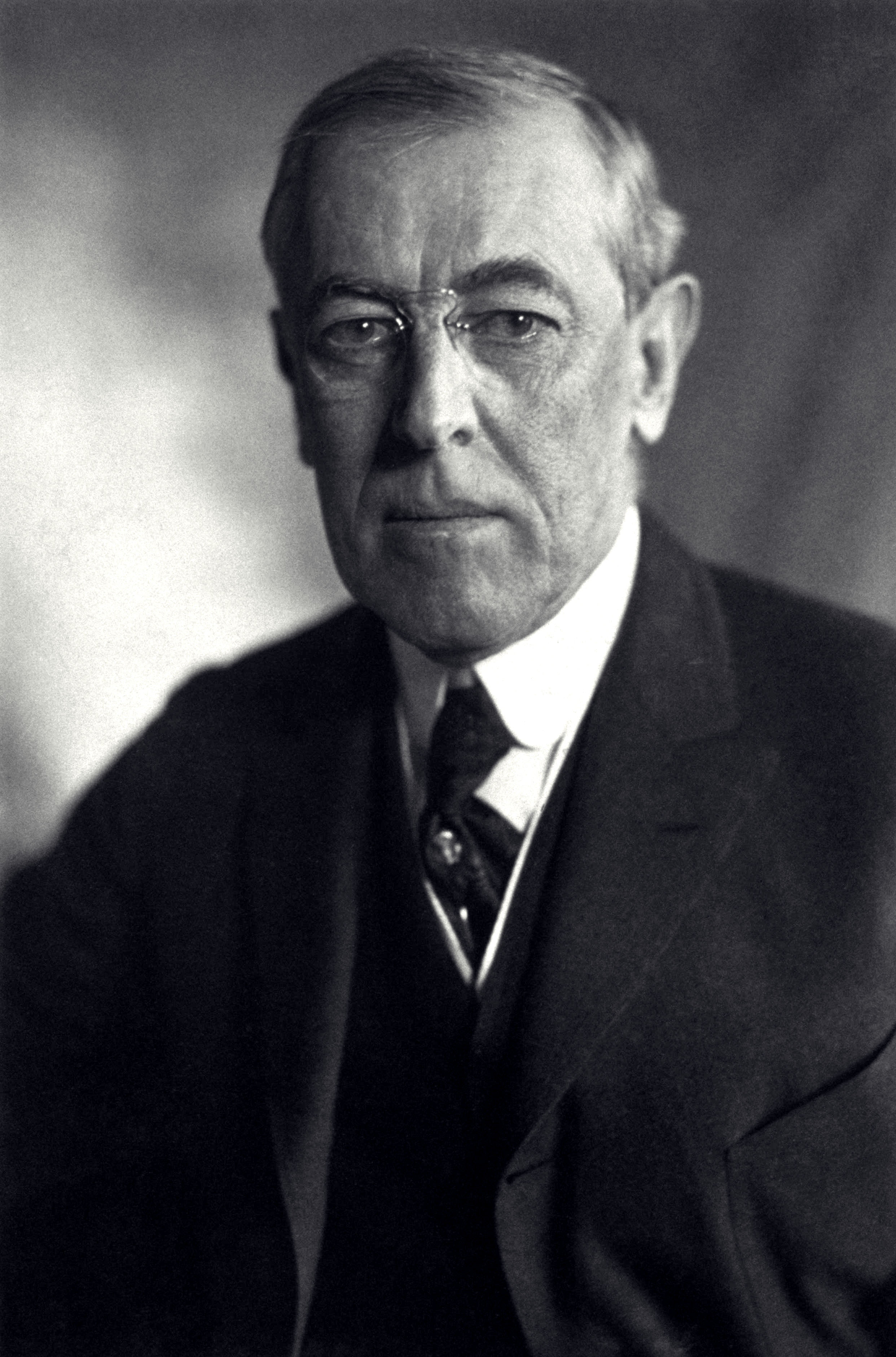
Portrait of Thomas Woodrow Wilson, the President of the United States of America, 1919

Woodrow Wilson (28 December 1856 – 3 February 1924) was elected President of the United States based on domestic issues in 1912, and re-elected in 1916. He based his 1916 re-election campaign around the slogan "he kept us out of war", and had worked hard to broker a compromise peace. In early 1917 Berlin decided to launch all-out submarine warfare designed to sink American ships bringing supplies to Britain; in the Zimmermann Telegram it proposed a military alliance with Mexico to fight a war against the US. The nation was poorly armed when it went to war in April 1917, but it had millions of potential fresh soldiers, billions of dollars, and huge supplies of raw materials needed by the Allies. Officially Wilson kept the US independent of the Allies.

In 1918 Wilson took personal control of negotiations with Germany, including the armistice. He issued his Fourteen Points, his view of a post-war world that could avoid another terrible conflict. It had an enormous impact on both sides in Europe and made him the man of the hour in Paris. A leader of the Progressive Movement, he assembled a high-powered group of academic advisors to help him in Paris but his distrustful personality led him to break with a series of close advisors, most notably Colonel House. He made a major blunder by refusing to bring along any prominent Republicans to Paris, which politicised the American debate and weakened his support. His main goal was a long-term solution to end warfare based on the League of Nations and self-determination of nations. He paid special attention to creating new nations out of defunct empires and was opposed to harsh terms and reparations imposed on Germany. A Presbyterian of deep religious faith, Wilson appealed to a gospel of service and infused a profound sense of moralism into his idealistic internationalism, now referred to as "Wilsonianism". Wilsonianism calls for the United States to enter the world arena to fight for democracy, and has been a contentious position in American foreign policy.

== Purpose ==
While the Allies at the Paris Peace Conference made up more than twenty nations, the Big Four entered Versailles and were leading architects of the Treaty of Versailles which was signed by Germany; the Treaty of Saint-Germain, with Austria; the Treaty of Neuilly, with Bulgaria; the Treaty of Trianon, with Hungary; and the Treaty of Sèvres, with the Ottoman Empire. At one point Orlando temporarily pulled out of the conference because Italian demands were not met, leaving the other three countries as the sole major architects of the talk, referred to as the "Big Three". The Italian delegation returned after 11 days. Mr. Maurice Hankey was the council's sole secretary and took minutes.

== See also ==
- The Heavenly Twins
- Big Three (World War II)
