= Dresscode (disambiguation) =

A dress code or dresscode is a set of rules about clothing.

Dress code or Dresscode may also refer to:

- The Dress Code, 2000 film originally released as Bruno
- dressCode, Scottish charity aiming to close the gender gap in computer science
- Dresscode (TV series), Finnish TV series about fashion
- Dress Codes, a 2002 memoir by Noelle Howey
- Dress Codes (book), a 2021 book by Richard Thompson Ford
- "Dress Code" (Dexter), a 2013 television episode
