= Marc-Anthony Hurr =

New Zealand entrepreneur

Marc-Anthony Hurr (born November 17, 1991) is a business entrepreneur and mentor. He is the co-founder of Teapayment, Sunday Marketplace and Iban Online UAB. He is the CEO and Director of Operations of Teapayment LTD. His company works in the electronic payments sector. He is also a Board Member of Safebrok, an insurance brokerage firm. He was the CEO of Sunday Marketplace.

== Biography ==
Marc-Anthony Hurr was born on November 17, 1991, in Ōtāhuhu, a suburb of Auckland, New Zealand. His mother is Marie-Line Hurr (née Fages), a French, Spanish and English language teacher who was born in France. His father, Stanley Hurr, is an English painter, caricaturist and illustrator born in London. He studied Engineering Mathematics at the University of Bristol and received a Master’s degree. After that, he studied Industrial Engineering at the University of Seville. He finished his education at Harvard Business School.

In 2016 Hurr moved to London, UK and begin working in a consultancy firm. Later that year, he resigned to launch a Credit Institution in the Dominican Republic. The firm later relocated its offices to Mexico City.

Hurr returned to the UK in 2018 and co-founded Teapayment, an Electronic Money Institution, and in the same year founded Sunday Marketplace.

In 2020, Hurr co-founded Iban Online UAB in Lithuania, became a Board Member of Safebrok, and in 2021 co-founded International Sunday.
