= Yokohama Stadium =

Baseball Stadium in Yokohama, Japan

- Hamster/Hamastar (ハマスタ)

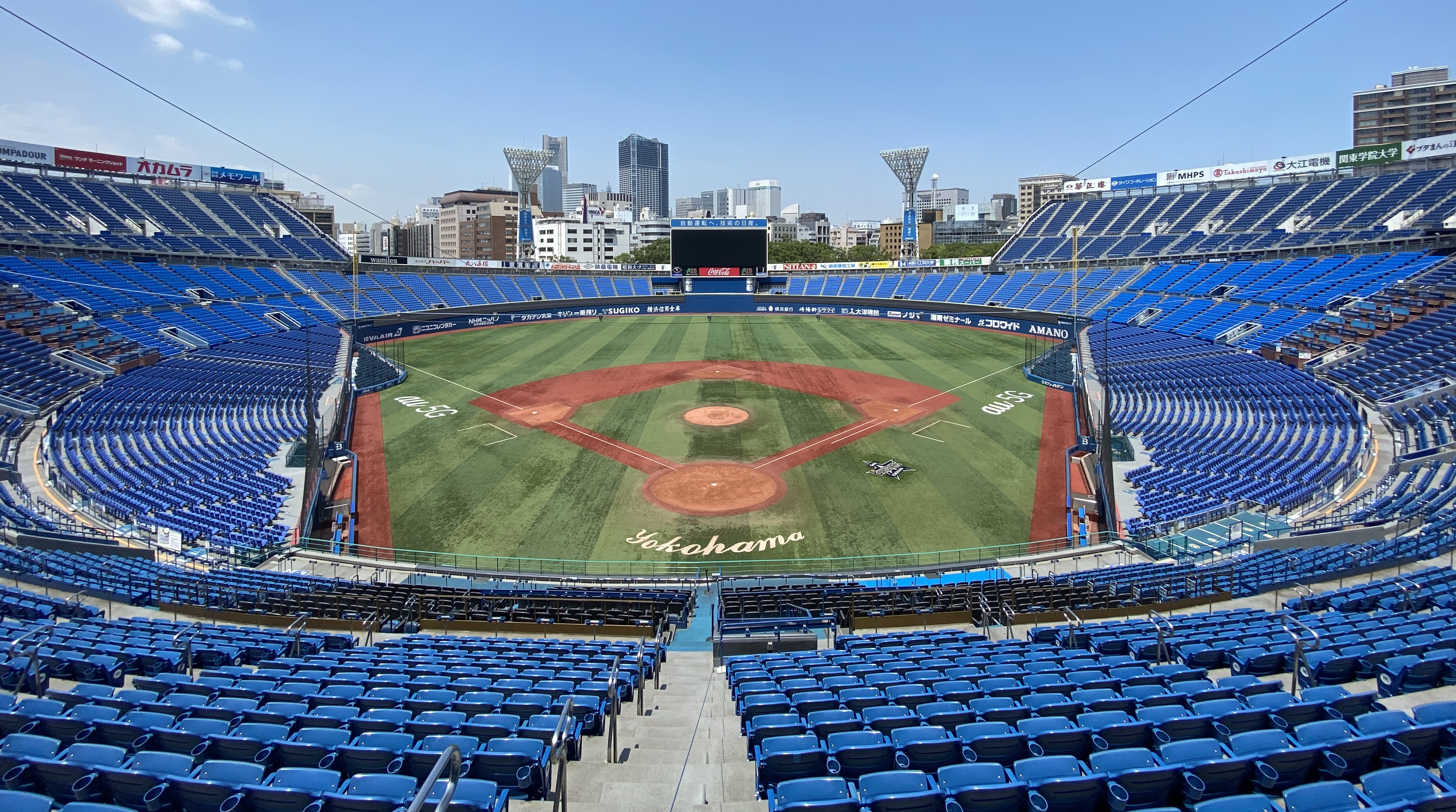
- Yokohama Stadium in 2020
- Interactive map of Yokohama Stadium
- Address: Yokohama Park, Naka-ku
- Location: Yokohama, Kanagawa, Japan
- Coordinates: 35°26′36.34″N 139°38′24.36″E
- Owner: Yokohama City
- Operator: Yokohama Stadium, Ltd.
- Capacity: 20,000 (Football); 35,250 (Baseball); 48,000 (Concerts)
- Surface: FieldTurf (since 2003)
- Field size: Left/right field – 94 m (308.4 ft); Left/right-center – 111.4 m (366 ft); Center Field – 118 m (387.1 ft); Height of Outfield Fence – 5 m (16.4 ft)
- Public transit: Yokohama Municipal Subway: Blue Line at Kannai; Yokohama Minatomirai Railway: Minatomirai Line at Nihon-ōdōri

Construction
- Groundbreaking: April 1977
- Opened: 4 April 1978
- Renovated: March 2007 (1st); 2018-2020 (2nd)
- Cost: 4,800,000,000 yen

Tenants
- Yokohama DeNA BayStars (NPB) (1978–present); Kanagawa High School Qualifier Tournament; Japan Bowl (1980–1991)

Website
- https://www.yokohama-stadium.co.jp/

Yokohama Stadium (横浜スタジアム, Yokohama Sutajiamu) is a baseball stadium in Naka-ku, Yokohama, Japan. It opened in 1978 and has a capacity of 34,046 people. It is primarily used for baseball and is the home field of the Yokohama DeNA BayStars and has the nickname of "Hamastar" (ハマスタ) a mix of the words yokoHAMA, STAdium and baySTARs. Due to the pronunciation also reminding people of the rōmaji pronunciation of the word "Hamster", the hamster ended up becoming one of the BayStars mascots as well.

The stadium features dirt around the bases and pitcher's mound, but with dirt colored turf infield and base paths. The entire green portion of the field is also turfed.

As of 2026, the stadium had become a cashless stadium, being the 4th stadium in the NPB to adopt it.

== Concerts ==
Santana and Masayoshi Takanaka performed at the stadium on 2 August 1981.

Anzen Chitai performed at the stadium on 31 August 1985. The live performance titled "One Night Theater 1985" was recorded and released on VHS on 21 December 1985, and on LaserDisc and Video High Density on 25 January 1986. The performance was released on CD and DVD on 19 August 1998.

Prince performed his final shows with his backing band, The Revolution, at the stadium during his 1986 Parade Tour. The final show is known for the moment when Prince, uncharacteristically, destroys 2 guitars, including the original "cloud" guitar made for the film Purple Rain, during a final encore of "Purple Rain".

Michael Jackson performed at the stadium during his Bad World Tour in five sold-out concerts, more than any other artist in Yokohama, for a total audience of 240,000 fans (about 48,000 people per concert) on 25, 26 and 27 September 1987 and 3–4 October 1987 and the 26 September Concert was recorded and released as a bootleg VHS titled Michael Jackson Live in Japan, and is also available on YouTube in its Entirety.

Tina Turner played 4 concerts for the first time at the stadium in March 1988 during Break Every Rule Tour.

Madonna performed, on three consecutive nights, during her Blond Ambition World Tour on 25–27 April 1990. The final date was recorded and released on 25 July 1990, as a VHS and Laserdisc exclusively in Japan, titled Blond Ambition – Japan Tour 90.

Bon Jovi played 3 sold-out concerts here on their These Days tour in May 1996. The second date was broadcast on Wowow.

Luna Sea performed a Christmas concert here on 23 December as the final performance of their 1996 tour. There they announced a yearlong hiatus for the members to perform solo activities. The concert was later released as the Mafuyu no Yagai DVD in 2003.

Nana Mizuki performed a concert here on 3 August as the final performance of her 2014 domestic tour, which drew a crowd of about 32,000 fans, making it the biggest local artist event ever held here.

In September 2014, ONE OK ROCK held a 2-day concert in front of a crowd of 60,000 people called "Mighty Long Fall Live at Yokohama Stadium 2014".

In March 2016, AKB48 held a 2-day concert in 3 shows for commemorate Minami Takahashi graduation. In 2019, AKB48 held spring concert on 27 April and followed by Rino Sashihara graduation concert from HKT48 on 28 April.

In April 2023, Hinatazaka46 held 2-days concert for commemorate their 4th anniversary as Hinatazaka46 called "4-kaime no Hinatansai". And considered this Stadium as their homebase, where they're held anniversary concert every year (since 2023) (4回目のひな誕祭).

== Sports ==
In December 1978, UNLV played BYU in a sold out college football game.

Yokohama Stadium served as the baseball and softball venue at the 2020 Summer Olympics.

Ever since moving to Yokohama in 1978 from Tokyo, the Yokohama DeNA BayStars have called Yokohama Stadium home.

Yokohama Stadium annually hosts the Kanagawa Prefecture qualifiers for the Summer Koshien, as well some tournaments of Industrial Baseball level.

It hosted an Australian rules football match and drew the second largest crowd for such an event outside of Australia.

== Gallery ==
Game night at the stadium, 2023

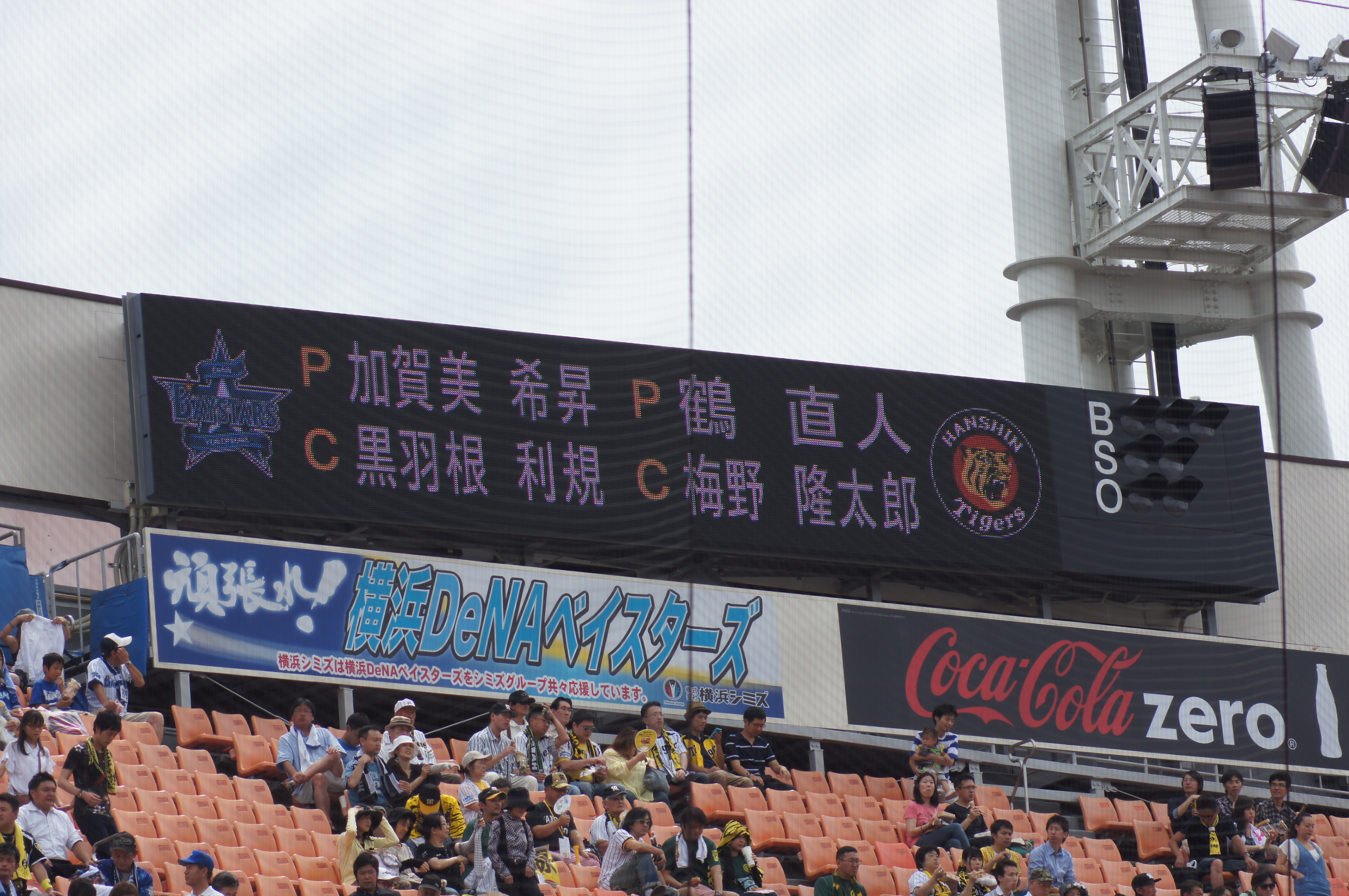
Smaller stadium scoreboard

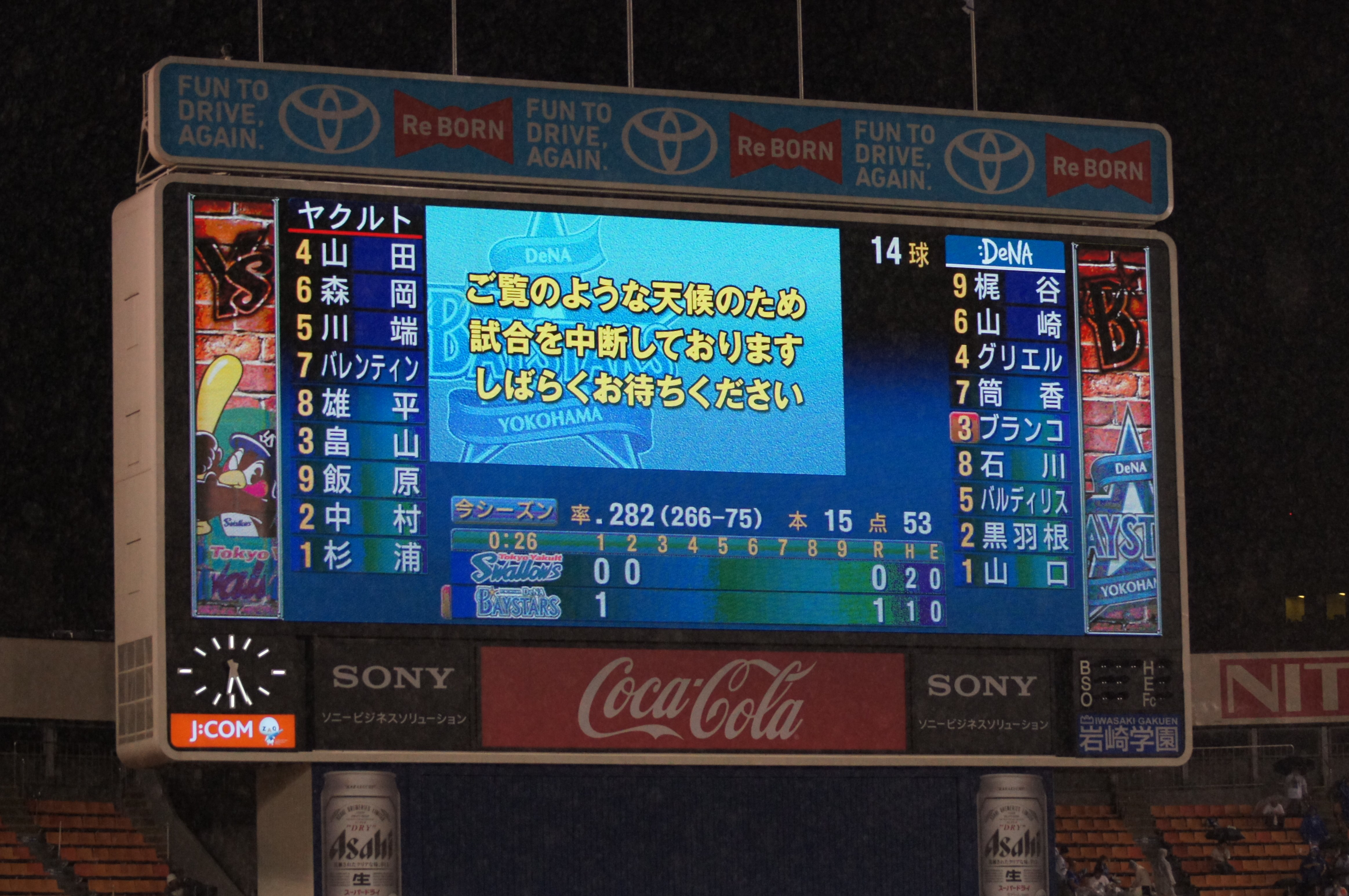
Main stadium scoreboard pre renovation (2014)

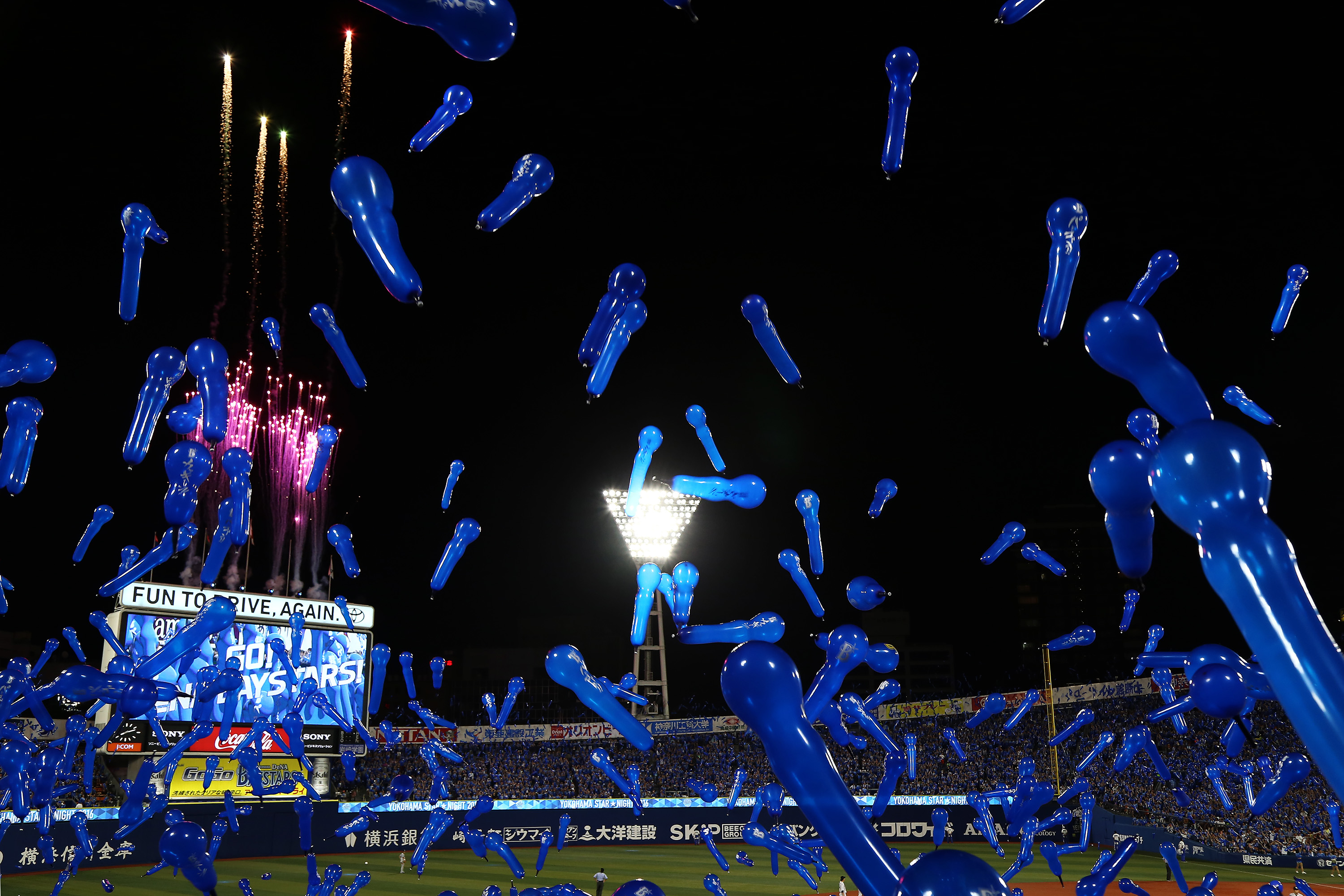
Fans releasing balloons during the 7th inning stretch

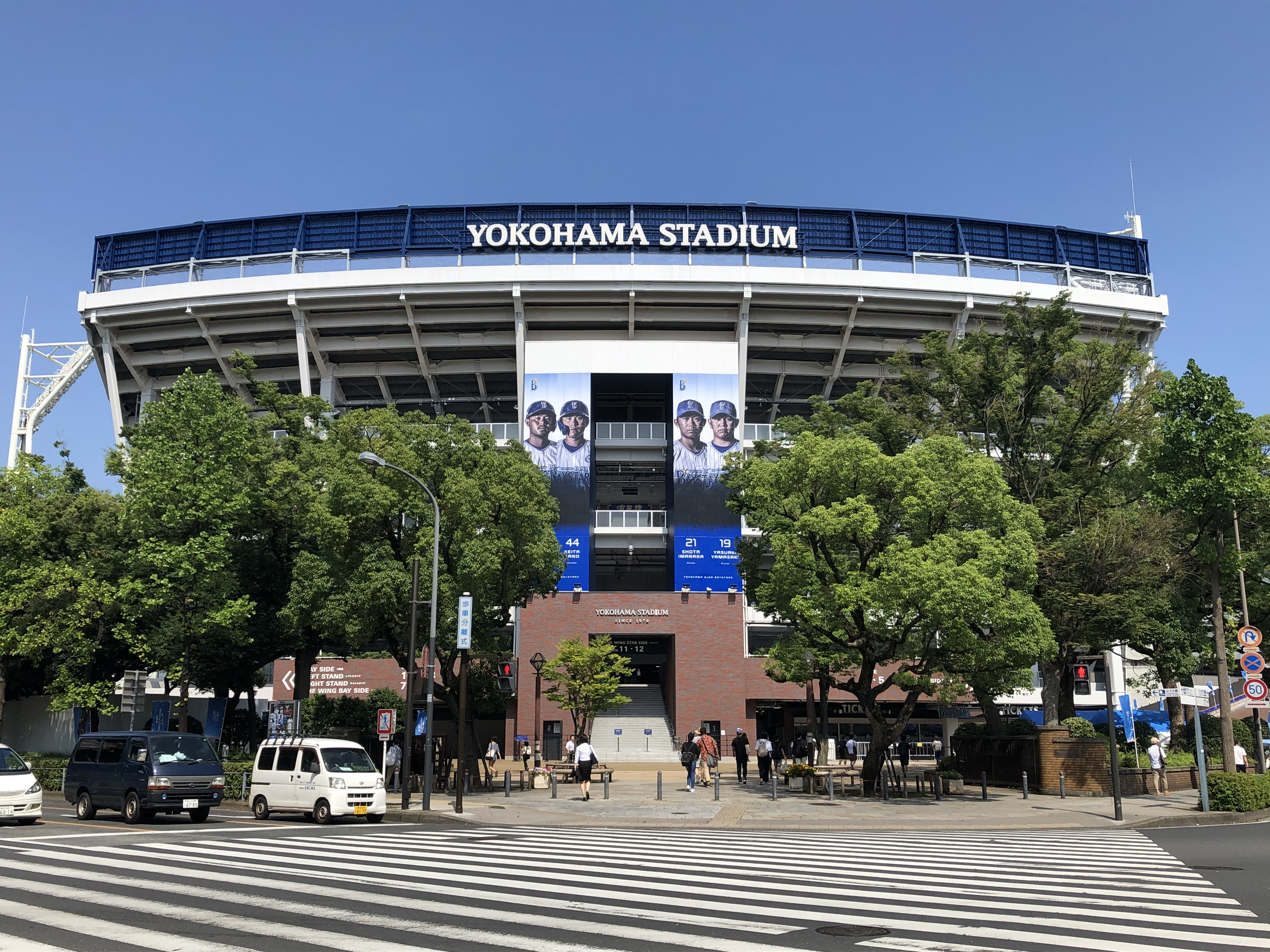
Exterior of Yokohama Stadium (June 2020)

== Attendances ==
The home attendances of the Yokohama DeNA BayStars at the Yokohama Stadium:

Season	Games	Total attendance	Average attendance
2025	71	2,360,411	33,245
