= St Kentigern's Academy =

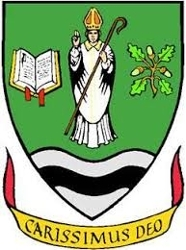
- St Kentigern's Academy school emblem.

Location
- 60 West Main Street; Blackburn, West Lothian, EH47 7LX; Scotland; 55.8714°N 3.6342°W

Information
- Type: Secondary school
- Motto: Latin: Carissimus Deo
- Religious affiliation: Roman Catholic
- Founded: 1973
- Local authority: West Lothian Council
- Head Teacher: Gerry Burns
- Gender: Mixed
- Age: 11 to 18
- Houses: Columba, Margaret and Ninian
- Colours: Green, black, and white
- Website: www.stkentigernsacademy.org

St. Kentigern's Academy is a Roman Catholic, comprehensive school in Blackburn, West Lothian, Scotland. It is one of three Catholic secondaries in the local authority area (the others being St Margaret's Academy in Livingston and Sinclair Academy in Winchburgh) and serves the communities in the western and northern parts of West Lothian including Armadale, Bathgate, Fauldhouse, Linlithgow and Whitburn.

The school was built in 1973 and refurbished in 1995/6 and again in 2009. A large amount of the schools main building was reopened in April 2026 after a £35 million reconstruction project to remove RAAC roofing.

== History ==
In 2009, there was a formal opening of a £19,000,000 refurbishment and extension to the school; guests included the late Cardinal Keith O'Brien as well as singer Susan Boyle, a former pupil.

In 2012, a group of pupils made a video to highlight the high rate of poverty amongst children in the UK, and submitted it to competition for Unicef. As well as winning the competition, they were also awarded a Rotary Young Citizens Award.

In June 2017 a 16-year-old student was instructed by the Head Teacher, Mr Sharkey, to remove an LGBT Pride badge from his uniform on the basis that it "Promoted homosexuality". However, West Lothian Council later denied these claims stating "Pupils at St Kentigern's are asked to remove all non-school related badges from their uniforms". A stabbing incident occurred in September 2017, where a 13-year-old slashed a 14-year-old in the canteen, which had around 200 people in it at the time. The weapon was believed to be a kitchen knife. Charges were pressed on the 13-year-old perpetrator.

In 2017 and 2019, Computing Science teacher, Toni Scullion, won a number of awards for her work in furthering women in Tech, including the 2019 Secondary Teacher of the Year award at the Scottish Women in Tech awards.

In 2022, all schools in Scotland were ranked by exam pass rate, St Kentigern's Academy placed 10th in West Lothian Bearley beating Deans Community High and placing 112th out of 340 in Scotland.

In March 2023, urgent repairs and refurbishments began at the school after an earlier inspection found RAAC in part of the schools roofing.

On 6 June 2023, 14-year-old Hamdan Aslam died following an incident. Police were called to the school at approximately 13:20 and the boy was taken by ambulance to hospital where he died shortly after. A post mortem was carried out and the cause of death was determined to be natural causes via a heart condition. A report was sent to the procurator fiscal.

In November 2024, head teacher Andrew Sharkey suddenly died after the discovery of a brain tumour; he had been in office from April 2014 until his death. In April 2025, it was announced that Dr Gerry Burns (formerly of St Margaret's Academy and Sinclair Academy) would be the new headteacher.

In April 2026, a new £35 million wing of the school opened to the puplic, replacing the previous section of the school found to contain RAAC roofing. The new wing includes a large dining area, games hall, fitness suite and a large range of other learning and office spaces.

== Notable former pupils ==
- Susan Boyle (b. 1961), singer
- Stephen Greenhorn (b. 1964), playwright and screenwriter
- John Rae (b. 1966), jazz drummer, composer and band leader
- Fern Brady (b. 1986), comedian, podcaster and writer
- Lewis Capaldi (b. 1996), singer-songwriter and musician
