= St Margaret's Academy =

Catholic secondary school in Scotland

Location
- Sean Carson Road; Livingston, West Lothian, EH54 6AT; Scotland; 55.8888°N 3.5229°W

Information
- School type: Secondary school
- Religious affiliation: Catholic
- Established: 1994; 32 years ago
- Local authority: West Lothian Council
- Head Teacher: David Sheerin
- Gender: Mixed
- Age: 11 to 18
- Houses: Melrose, Jedburgh, Dryburgh
- Website: www.stmargaretsacademy.westlothian.org.uk

St Margaret's Academy in Livingston, West Lothian, Scotland is a Catholic secondary school. It is one of two Catholic secondaries in the local authority area (the other being St Kentigern's Academy in Blackburn).

The school serves Broxburn, East Calder and the areas of Livingston: Eliburn, Deans, Howden, Craigshill, Dedridge, Ladywell, Livingston Village, Anniesland and Knightsridge.

== History ==
St Margaret's Academy opened in 1994 as the successor to St Mary's Academy in Bathgate and Our Lady's High School, Broxburn. In 1993 both schools, as two different entities, changed their name and uniform to Saint Margaret's. The school is in the Howden area of Livingston near the town centre.

== Achievements ==
- British Council's International School Award 2019-2022
- Mitsubishi Electric ‘Pump It Up!’ Challenge Champion 2025

== Weekend programmes ==
The Scotland Japanese School (スコットランド日本語補習授業校 Sukottorando Nihongo Hoshū Jugyō Kō), a weekend Japanese school, is held at St. Margaret's. It first opened in 1982 and moved to Livingston in April 2003.

== Notable alumni ==
- Scott Arfield, football player
- Mark Burchill, football player and coach
- Elise Christie, short track speed skater
- John Kerr, figure skater
