= Heavenly Twins (Sumner and Cunliffe) =

Moniker for two British delegates in 1919

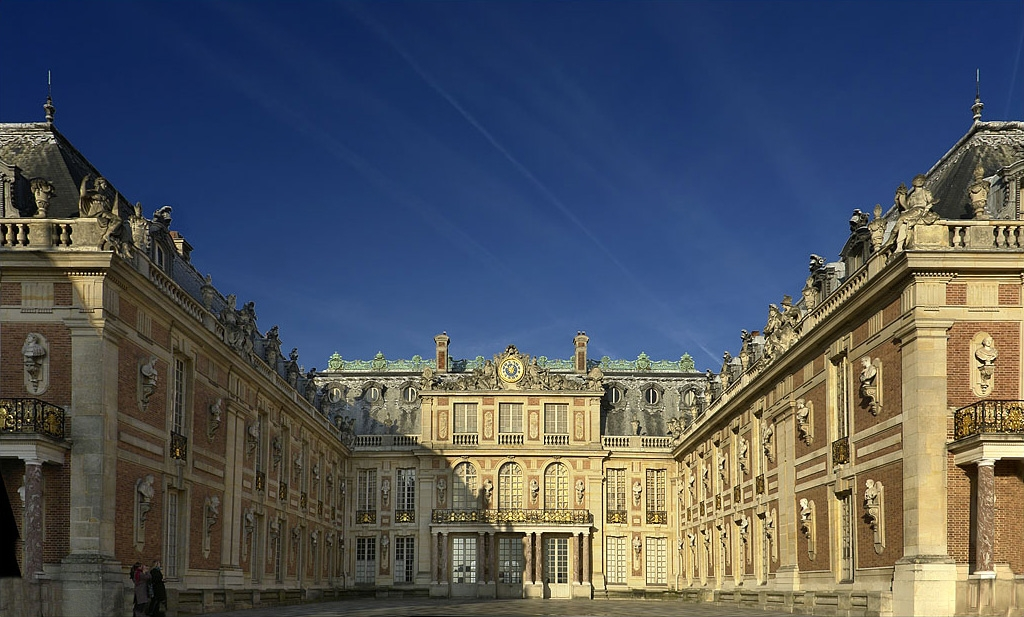
The Palace of Versailles where the 1919 discussions concerning Germany took place.

The Heavenly Twins was the name assigned to two British delegates, the Judge Lord Sumner and the Banker Lord Cunliffe, during the 1919 Treaty of Versailles negotiations who were to set the terms of the peace to be imposed on Germany following the end of World War I. The two lords, together with the Prime Minister of Australia Billy Hughes, were responsible for presenting the British and British Dominions' case concerning the amount of compensatory payments, or war reparations, that were to be extracted from Germany.

== Origin of the name the "Heavenly Twins" ==
There are mixed views on how the handle was coined. For Milo Keynes, the phrase was first used by the American diplomat Norman Davis. While for historian Antony Lentin, the phrase arose among younger members of the British delegation. There were three principal reasons: the "astronomically" large sums the Twins thought should be extracted from Germany, the "beatific smile" they would sometimes both adopt after rendering a judgement in situations where they had the upper hand in a debate, and the fact they were generally inseparable at Versailles—both at work and while enjoying the Paris nightlife. Additionally, Britons in 1919 would have been well aware of Sarah Grand's New Woman novel The Heavenly Twins, a much talked-about bestseller in 1893.

== The British position on reparations at Versailles ==
=== Pre conference dissension: the Heavenly Twins opposing Maynard Keynes ===
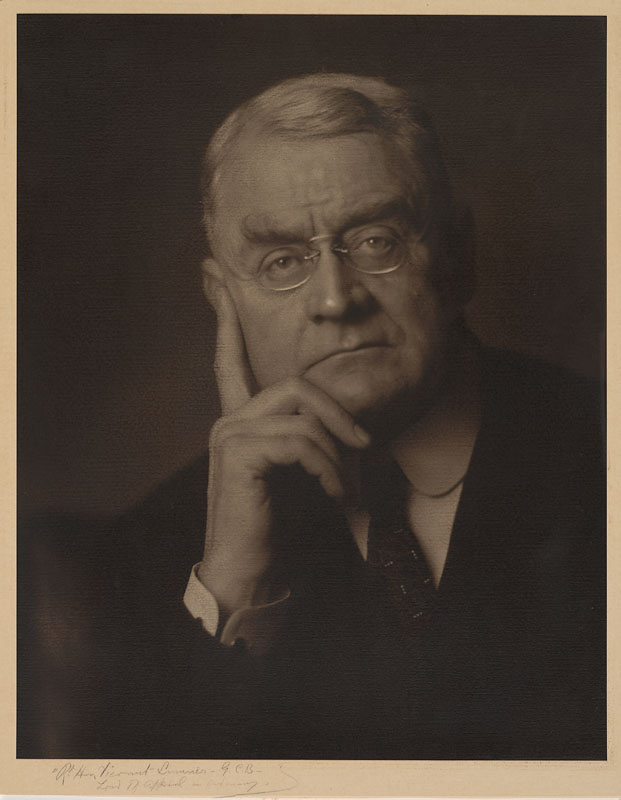
Lord Sumner, one of the Heavenly Twins.

In the months leading up to the Versailles Conference, economist John Maynard Keynes had been assigned the task of defining the British Treasury's position on the amount of reparations Germans could be expected to pay. Keynes came up with a figure of £3,000 million, saying that in actuality receiving even a total of £2,000 million would be satisfactory. A power bloc composed of businessmen and representatives of the Dominions, supported by conservative politicians, felt this was far too low, but in the autumn of 1918 the Liberals had the upper hand in the governing coalition, and key ministers generally supported Keynes's view, which he had expected to be able to present at Versailles. The balance of power shifted after the December 1918 coupon election. While the liberal Lloyd George was retained as Prime Minister, voter pressure generated by a determined press campaigning had caused him to adopt a hard line attitude towards Germany. Most of the other Liberal MPs had lost their seats, including even the party leader H. H. Asquith.

The new government commissioned an alternative committee to re-assess Germany's ability to pay, its members including Lord Cunliffe. The committee estimated that the Germans would be able to pay the full cost of the war at £24,000 million. While this figure was approximately eight times the annual GDP of Germany before the war, Lord Cunliffe still went on to speculate that he may have underestimated Germany's ability to pay, saying that if someone suggested Germany could pay in the region of £50,000 million he "would not disbelieve them".

It was decided that the Heavenly Twins would present Great Britain's case at the Versailles conference, with Keynes and the Treasury formerly excluded from high level talks. Keynes still attended Versailles, as the Treasury's chief representative, with a broad remit to decide financial aspects of the transition to peace—he would still try to influence the reparations settlement by lobbying the decision makers through back channels. Other British attendees would support Keynes' view, including Jan Smuts the prime minister of South Africa, Bonar Law the Chancellor, and Edwin Montagu the Secretary of State for India.

=== Debate on Reparations at the conference ===
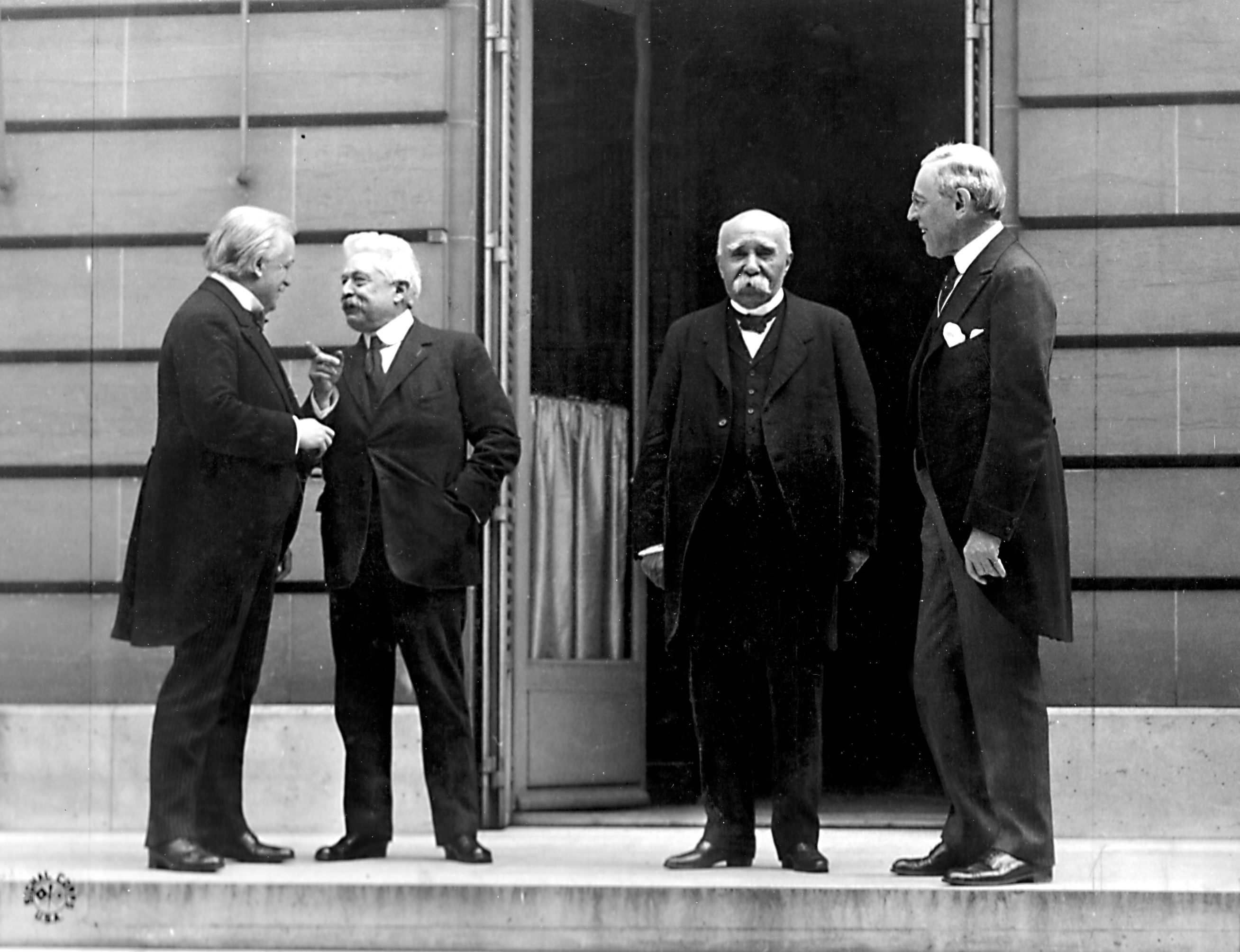
The Council of Four: from left, UK Prime Minister Lloyd George, Italian Prime Minister Orlando, French Prime Minister Clemenceau, and US President Wilson.

Leaders from 32 allied nations were present at Versailles, but major decisions were made almost entirely by the Supreme War Council—briefly the Council of Ten, later condensed to the Council of Four. Referring to the Council of Four, Keynes asserted in his Economic Consequences of the Peace that if the world is to understand its destiny it had a great need of light:

… on the complex struggle of human will and purpose, not yet finished, which, concentrated in the persons of four individuals in a manner never paralleled, made them, in the first months of 1919, the microcosm of mankind.

The three principal decision makers were Britain's Lloyd George, France's Clemenceau and America's President Wilson—the fourth council member, Italy's Prime Minister Orlando, had little to do with settling the reparations question. The allies deliberately excluded Germany from having any representative on the high level talks, mindful of the skill of German diplomats such as Count Brockdorff-Rantzau and the success Talleyrand had enjoyed at the Congress of Vienna in exploiting division among the victorious allies to win a very favourable settlement after Napoleon's defeat. Decisions by the top level council were informed by expert commissions. The Heavenly Twins sat on the commission dedicated to reparations. This commission was itself divided into three sub committees. The first was to assess how much each allied power deserved and in what proportion the moneys would be divided, assuming Germany was unable to pay the full total amount assessed. The second subcommittee was to assess Germany's ability to pay and the third to agree on ways to guarantee payment.

A key issue for the British in the first sub-committee was the American's insistence that compensation should only be awarded for damage to civilians and their property, not for military costs. Taken strictly this would mean by far the lion's share of compensation would go to the French—Britain and her Dominions had suffered huge losses to their armed forces but the fighting had been mainly on continental Europe, with British civilians scarcely hurt at all. Lord Sumner had presented the case that pensions paid to the widows of soldiers should count as civilian costs but the Americans did not agree and so the matter was escalated to the Council of Four, where President Wilson himself was said to reject Lord Sumners argument "almost with contempt". Lloyd George then took a hand and, after several days, he was able to convince Smuts of the merits of Sumners case and got Smuts to re-approach Wilson. The same argument Wilson had roundly rejected from Lord Summer was accepted when put by Smuts who, like the President, was a Christian, a scholar, and an idealist. Other American delegates had tried to persuade Wilson that it was not logical to count pensions as civilian damages but he replied "Logic! Logic! I don't give a damn for logic. I am going to include pensions." This led to an increase in the share that was to be awarded to Britain, and later would result in the total claim on Germany being increased as well.

Lord Cunliffe chaired the subcommittee that was to determine Germany's capacity to pay. At first the Twins continued to insist Germany could pay £25bn but the US Treasury representatives Thomas W. Lamont and John Foster Dulles, supported by Norman Davis, refused to hear of this and The Twins reduced their recommended figure to £8bn. The leading French representative on the commission, Louis Loucheur, had told Davis off the record that he personally doubted the Germans could afford anywhere near this amount, but that he could not publicly advocate anything less than Lord Cunliff's figure. The Americans still opposed the revised amount and, after an escalation to the Council of Four, a secret alternative commission was set up consisting of Lamont, Loucheur and Montagu. This commission recommended the total amount to be extracted to be limited to about £5bn, but Lloyd George would not accept this unless Lord Cunliffe could be persuaded. In Robert Skidelsky's view, Lloyd George was afraid the Heavenly Twins would "crucify" him at Parliament if he agreed to too small a figure—the majority of MPs now being conservative with many also being businessmen. The Heavenly Twins, together with the French delegation and support from Lloyd George, continued to pressure the Americans who progressively gave ground from their initially strong position that only limited reparations should be imposed. This was due to decisions taken by delegation heads President Wilson and Colonel House. The less senior US delegates like Dulles, Lamont, Davis, Bernard Baruch & Vance McCormick remained firm in their view that it would be a mistake to impose too high reparations on Germany.

Keynes tried to argue against the Heavenly Twins but they rebuffed him, mockingly referring to him as "Herr von K". For most of the conference, Lloyd George himself would only take limited notice of Keynes's plea for moderation. Towards the end however, the prime minister began to show signs that he had moved towards Keynes' view. Keynes came up with a plan that he argued would not only help Germany and other impoverished central European powers, but would also be good for the world economy as a whole. It involved the writing down of war debts which would have the effect of increasing international trade all round. Lloyd George agreed that it might be acceptable to the British electorate. America was against it however, the US then being the largest creditor and also as by this time President Wilson had started to believe in the merits of a harsh peace as a warning to future aggressors. At the end of the conference a compromise conceived by Dulles was agreed on where Germany accepted a theoretically unlimited "war guilt" obligation, but in practice the amount payable would be limited. Lloyd George worked to insure no firm figure was set by the conference's end, in the opinion of economic history writer Liaquat Ahamed his plan was to wait until the passions after the war had cooled, and then set about ensuring that a figure well below the Twin's recommendation was agreed on. By the close of the conference it was left open for the total to be far higher than Keynes's was happy about; the first firm figure recommended by the reparations committee in mid-1920 was set at $33 billion. He left before the very end and resigned from the Treasury, writing to Lloyd George: "The battle is lost. I leave the Twins to gloat over the devastation of Europe." Keynes went on to write The Economic Consequences of the Peace, where he warned of the grave consequences of continuing to inflict excessive punishment on the German people. According to Ahamed and historian Carroll Quigley, reparations remained a key global issue for the two decades after the war, consuming statesmen's energies and attention more than any other issue.

== Criticism ==
According to civil servant James Headlan-Morley, who was also present at Versailles, the Twins acted as "the two bad men of the conference … always summoned when some particularly nefarious act has to be committed". The Under Secretary of State for Foreign Affairs Lord Cecil, referring to Lord Sumner, had said "Some very able lawyers can be very cruel men". For the British Prime Minister they were "singularly able men", whose help was crucial in securing an increased share of the reparations, but Lloyd George was also to record in his memoirs that he had felt trapped by the Twins into pushing for higher reparations than he would have preferred.

In the following decades, the French were often primarily blamed for the high payments imposed and Britain second though, due to the influence of the Heavenly Twins and the intrigues at Versailles rather than intent by her leaders. An exception was in Germany, where economic writer James Grabbe has stated that the common view in the 1930s was that Britain had desired to economically cripple Germany even as early as 1916, as expressed in this 1934 quote from German historian Oswald Spengler:

The war of 1914, however, was fought by England, not on France's behalf nor on Belgium's, but for the sake of the 'week-end,' to dispose of Germany, if possible, for good, as an economic rival. In 1916 there set in, side by side with the military war, a systematic economic war, to be carried on when the other came inevitably to an end . . . The Treaty of Versailles was not intended to create a state of peace but to organize the relation of forces in such a way that this aim could at any time be secured by fresh demands and measures. Hence the handing over of the colonies and the merchant fleet, the seizure of bank bonds, property, and patents in all countries, the severance of industrial areas like Upper Silesia and the Saar valley, the inauguration of the Republic—by which it was expected (and correctly) that industry would be undermined by the power assumed by trade unions—and finally the reparations, which England, at least, intended not as war indemnification but as a permanent burden on German industry until it should collapse.

In 1916 the conservative coalition that acted as the Heavenly Twins' power base had yet to form. Modern historians do not endorse Spengler's view, but they have questioned whether the Twin's influence at Versailles was really decisive. Historian Antony Lentin argues that Lloyd George wanted high reparations imposed, and used the Twins as scapegoats, claiming that he "was never in thrall to the Twins: they were the obedient agents of his bidding."

== Notes and references ==
=== Primary sources ===
- John Maynard Keynes. The Economic Consequences of the Peace at Project Gutenberg
- David Lloyd George, The Truth About the Peace Treaties. 2 vols. Victor Gollancz, 1938

=== Secondary sources ===
- Anthony Lentin, Lloyd George and the Lost Peace: From Versailles to Hitler, 1919-1940, Macmillan, 2001
- Margaret MacMillan, The Paris Peace Conference of 1919 and Its Attempt to End War
