= Mark Burchill =

Scottish footballer (born 1980)

Personal information
- Full name: Mark James Burchill
- Date of birth: 18 August 1980 (age 46)
- Place of birth: Broxburn, Scotland
- Height: 5 ft 8 in (1.73 m)
- Position: Striker

Youth career
- Celtic

Senior career*
| Years | Team | Apps | (Gls) |
| 1998–2001 | Celtic | 50 | (20) |
| 2000 | → Birmingham City (loan) | 13 | (4) |
| 2001 | → Ipswich Town (loan) | 7 | (1) |
| 2001–2005 | Portsmouth | 24 | (8) |
| 2003 | → Dundee (loan) | 11 | (2) |
| 2003 | → Wigan Athletic (loan) | 4 | (0) |
| 2003–2004 | → Sheffield Wednesday (loan) | 5 | (0) |
| 2004 | → Rotherham United (loan) | 3 | (1) |
| 2005 | Heart of Midlothian | 12 | (4) |
| 2005–2008 | Dunfermline Athletic | 84 | (24) |
| 2008–2009 | Rotherham United | 24 | (5) |
| 2009–2010 | Kilmarnock | 15 | (1) |
| 2010–2012 | Enosis Neon | 42 | (7) |
| 2012–2013 | Esan United | 2 | (1) |
| 2013–2015 | Livingston | 39 | (3) |
| Total | | 326 | (81) |

International career
| 1999 | Scotland U19 | 2 | (0) |
| 1998–2001 | Scotland U21 | 15 | (6) |
| 1999–2000 | Scotland | 6 | (0) |

Managerial career
- 2013–2014: Livingston (assistant)
- 2014–2015: Livingston
- * Club domestic league appearances and goals as of 18 December 2014

Mark James Burchill (born 18 August 1980) is a Scottish former professional football player, coach and scout. He played for Scottish clubs Celtic, Dundee, Hearts, Dunfermline Athletic, Kilmarnock and Livingston, and in England for Birmingham City, Ipswich Town, Portsmouth, Wigan Athletic, Sheffield Wednesday and Rotherham United. He was capped six times for the Scotland national team.

== Club career ==
=== Celtic ===
Burchill was born in Broxburn and grew up in Livingston, West Lothian, Scotland. He attended St Mary's Academy, Bathgate, and St. Margaret's Academy, Livingston. Burchill began his career at Scottish club Celtic for the 1997–98 season. In his first three seasons with the club he scored 20 Scottish Premier League goals in only 17 starts, with 33 appearances as a substitute. This prolific return saw him gain a place in the Scotland national football team, making his debut against Bosnia-Herzegovina in October 1999. While playing for Celtic against Jeunesse Esch of Luxembourg in the qualifying round of the 2000-01 UEFA Cup, Burchill scored the fastest-ever hat-trick in a European club match. However, successive managers failed to see the Scotland international as a part of the first team picture. The signing of £6 million Chris Sutton further pushed Burchill down the pecking order, and in September 2000 he moved to Birmingham City on a three-month loan, making his debut in a 2–0 home win over Tranmere Rovers. Burchill went on to score five goals in 17 games (10 as a substitute) during the spell. Birmingham wanted to complete the deal but were unable to agree personal terms with the player. In February 2001, Burchill chose to go on another three-month loan until the season's end at Ipswich Town, scoring once against Bradford City.

=== Portsmouth ===
During the off-season Burchill was signed by Portsmouth for a £600,000 fee. He showed his potential immediately at his new club. After making his debut against Stockport County he scored twice in his next game, against Grimsby Town. However, a knee injury suffered after less than a month put him out of action for 10 months. He recovered in time to start the 2002–03 season in fantastic form, but under new manager Harry Redknapp he fell down the pecking order and was made available for transfer. He did however contribute 18 appearances and four goals as they won the First Division Championship and promotion to the Premier League. He was loaned out to Dundee from February 2003 to the end of the season, and helped them reach the Scottish Cup Final, in which they lost narrowly to Rangers. During the 2003–04 season he was loaned out to firstly to Wigan Athletic, and then Sheffield Wednesday. However, he failed to score for either club and neither moved to make the deal permanent. Starting the 2004–05 season as fifth-choice striker, Burchill went on loan to Rotherham United, hoping to impress enough to restart his career. However, after only a month, and one goal against Crewe Alexandra, he was injured and returned to Portsmouth, where he was pushed further down the pecking order by the return to fitness of long-term injured striker Vincent Péricard.

=== Hearts and Dunfermline Athletic ===
On 28 January 2005, Burchill was allowed to leave Portsmouth on a free transfer after spending two years out of favour. He chose to return to Scotland and sign for Hearts, where he remained until the end of the season. On 6 July 2005, he joined Dunfermline Athletic where he scored 12 league goals in 31 games in his first season, despite the club struggling in the bottom half of the table. He signed a year's extension to his contract with the Pars in December 2006. In April 2008, Dunfermline manager Jim McIntyre announced that Burchill had been offered a new contract but had decided to leave the Scottish First Division side in order to "pursue other avenues".

=== Rotherham United and Kilmarnock ===
On 11 June 2008, Burchill signed a two-year deal with Rotherham United, where he previously enjoyed a loan spell during their Championship campaign. He scored his first goal for the Millers in the 1–1 draw away at Dagenham & Redbridge. However, Burchill left after the 2008–09 season. Kilmarnock manager Jim Jefferies had tried to sign Burchill in 2008 when the player chose to join Rotherham. In July 2009 Burchill joined the Scottish Premier League team in Italy for pre-season training, was reported to be "looking very sharp", and signed a one-year deal with the club in August. He injured his Achilles tendon in a friendly match against Burnley, an injury which eventually required surgery, and resumed training in mid-October. He scored his first goal for the club in a 1–1 draw with Hibernian on 12 December 2009.

=== Enosis Neon Paralimni and Esan United ===
Burchill became a free agent after his contract with Kilmarnock expired. On 1 September 2010 Burchill, having received several offers to move abroad, agreed to sign for Cypriot First Division side Enosis Neon Paralimni.

== International career ==
In October 1999, Burchil made his debut for the senior side as 79th minute substitute in European Championship Qualifier against Bosnia And Herzegovina. His first start came later than month in a 3–0 win against Lithuania.

He appeared as a substitute in both matches against England in the playoffs for the 2000 UEFA European Football Championship.

In total he played for Scotland on 6 occasions with his final appearance coming in April 2000 in a friendly against The Netherlands.

== Coaching and scouting career ==
On 25 March 2013, Burchill was named as a player/assistant manager of his home town club Livingston with Richie Burke to become the manager. However, Burchill was not eligible to play during the end of season 2012–13 due to international clearance not being received on time. He made his competitive debut for Livingston on 27 July 2013 in a Scottish Challenge Cup match against Berwick Rangers.

Burchill was appointed caretaker manager of Livingston in December 2014. As manager he led the club to success in the 2014–15 Scottish Challenge Cup and also saved the side's Scottish Championship status on the final day. Midway through the following season, Burchill was sacked with the club sitting second bottom in the Championship.

After his departure from Livingston, he worked as chief scout at AFC Bournemouth. When technical director Richard Hughes moved to Liverpool prior to the 2024–25 season, Burchill followed him to join the club's scouting team. In September 2026, he moved (again with Hughes) to become Director of Recruitment at Saudi Pro League club Al-Hilal.

== Personal life ==
His father's cousin is the Simple Minds musician Charlie Burchill.

Burchill's daughter, Tiree Burchill, is a Scottish youth international with caps at U15, U16, U17 and U19 levels; as of July 2025, she was playing for Hibs.

== Managerial statistics ==
As of 19 December 2015

| Team | Nat | From | To | Record | | | | |
| Team | Nat | From | To | G | W | D | L | Win % |
|---|---|---|---|---|---|---|---|---|
| Livingston | (Scotland) | December 2014 | December 2015 | 45 | 14 | 8 | 23 | 31.11 |

- Statistics include games as caretaker before permanent appointment.

== Honours ==
=== Player ===
Portsmouth

- Football League First Division: 2002–03

=== Manager ===
Livingston

- Scottish Challenge Cup: 2014–15
