= Toni Scullion =

Scottish computer science teacher

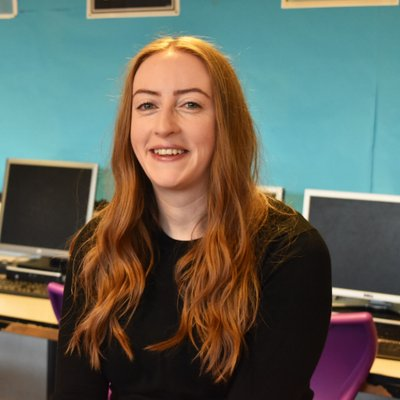
- Born: Scotland
- Education: Bachelor of Science Honours Degree, Computing Science (2007-2009) at Edinburgh Napier University Postgraduate Diploma, Higher Education: Secondary Education and Teaching (2010-2011) at the University of Strathclyde Master's Degree, Professional Enquiry: Educational Leadership (2013-2016) at the University of Stirling
- Employer: West Lothian Council
- Known for: Computing science education

Toni Scullion is a Scottish computer science teacher who founded the charity dressCode, which aims to advance computing science in schools, with a particular focus on closing the gender gap. She also co-founded the Ada Scotland Festival, which "brings together partners involved in addressing the issue of gender balance in computing science education in Scotland."

She has taught computing science at St Kentigern's Academy in Blackburn, West Lothian. She has received a number of accolades recognising her work to advance Computing Science and to improve diversity, including being nominated for a secondary teacher of the year at the Scotland Women in Technology awards three times, of which she has won twice and her charity dressCode has received multiple awards.

== Talks ==
Scullion has been a speaker at many events talking about her work with dressCode and closing the gender gap in computing science.

- EduTech conference, 2019
- MBN Solutions, "If they can't see it, they won’t be it"
- Cyber Scotland connect, volume 5
- Edinburgh's Women in Tech conference
- PWC TechSheCan charter Scottish launch
- Hoppers International Women's day conference, 2020
- Institution of Engineering and Technology
- West Lothian College, Interrupt19 Festival

== Awards ==
Scullion has won a variety of accolades for her work in furthering women in technology throughout her career.

- Champion of Champions at the Scottish Cyber Awards 2017.
- Secondary teacher of the year at the Scottish Women in Tech Awards 2018
- Cyber Security Teacher of the Year at the Scottish Cyber Awards 2019.
- Secondary Teacher of the Year at the Scottish Women in Tech Awards 2019.
- Highly Acclaimed Security Serious Unsung Heroes awards 2019
- Gender Diversity Champion of the Year at the Scottish Women in Tech Awards 2019.
- Secondary Teacher of the Year at the Scottish Women in Tech Awards 2019.
- Women in Tech Employer awards - Best Mentor 2020
- Women in Tech Excellence awards - Team Leader of the Year 2020
- Women in Tech Excellence awards - Hero of the Year 2020
- Security Serious - Best Educator Award 2020

== Recognition ==
Scullion work in advancing computing science at schools and furthering women in technology has been recognised on a number of platforms.

- Helped support USW efforts with the new degree to attract more female students (page 116)
- Recognised in Edtech50 magazine
- Motion in Scottish Parliament congratulating her on success at Cyber Security awards
- Motion in Scottish Parliament commending her on launching her charity dressCode
- Motion in Scottish Parliament congratulating her on success at Scotland Women in Technology awards
- UN #sheinnovates campaign
- Featured in project with Edinburgh University to help encourage more people to consider being a Computing Science teacher
- Recognised in recommendations of Scottish Governments Scottish technology ecosystem: review
- SC Magazine, Women of influence: 30 top cybersecurity leaders 2021
