= Our Lady's Secondary School =

Our Lady's Secondary School may refer to:

- Our Lady of Fatima Secondary School, Aligarh, India
- Our Lady of Mount Carmel Secondary School, Mississauga, Ontario
- Our Lady's Secondary School, Templemore, County Tipperary, Ireland

== See also ==
- Our Lady's High School (disambiguation)
