= St Mary's Academy, Bathgate =

Catholic school in West Lothian, Scotland

Coordinates: 55.895°N 3.624°W

Information
- Motto: Animo et Fide (Courageously and Faithfully)
- Religious affiliation: Roman Catholic
- Established: 1931
- Closed: 1994

St Mary's Academy was a Roman Catholic High School located in the eastern part of the town of Bathgate, West Lothian in Scotland. It was a state funded school for older children which drew its pupil roll from most of the towns in West Lothian. The motto was 'Animo et Fide' which translates from Latin as Courageously and Faithfully. The school was located on Edinburgh Road (A89).

== Buildings ==
The school, which opened in 1931, consisted of two rectangular stone buildings each containing a gymnasium in the centre and two quadrangles. These buildings were known as the East wing and the West wing, they were linked by a covered walkway (the link corridor). The main buildings were complemented for 20 years by a number of "temporary" structures referred to by staff and students as "the Maths Hut", "the Geography Huts", the "History Hut" and the "Music Huts". The East wing was the original St Mary's Senior Secondary. The school was renamed St Mary's Academy in 1965 when the building was amalgamated with the adjacent building of non-denominational Lindsay High School, whose students moved to a new campus nearby in Boghall in a merger with Bathgate Academy. The Rector in the late 1960s and 1970s was Hugh McCusker.

== Closure ==
In 1993, West Lothian Council announced plans to amalgamate the school with Our Lady's High School, Broxburn into one large purpose built school in Livingston. Both Our Lady's High and St Mary's adopted the new name, and both operated as St Margaret's Academy one year prior to their closures before moving all schooling to Livingston. The school closed in mid-1994. St Mary's was subsequently demolished in the late 1990s and is now the site of private sector housing. There is a small plaque commemorating the school at the north-west entrance to the estate, which includes 'Lindsay' and 'St Marys' in its street names. The housing development placed the street names wrongly, St. Mary's Place located where the old Lindsay High building was, and Lindsay Gardens where the old St. Mary's building was.

== Notable former pupils ==
- Mark Burchill, football player and coach
