= Electronic Money Association =

- Abbreviation: EMA
- Formation: October 2001
- Legal status: Association
- Location: Central London, UK
- Region served: Europe
- Website: http://e-ma.org/

The Electronic Money Association (EMA) is the trade body representing electronic money issuers in Europe.

== History ==
The EMA was founded in October 2001 by a group of electronic money issuers and prospective issuers to represent the interests of industry. The group took part in a regulatory working group set up in response to UK government consultation on the implementation of the E-Money Directive.

The group was then formalized into the EMA and its remit extended to issues of general interest to industry. The Financial Services Authority (now superseded by Financial Conduct Authority) proposed that the association develop a voluntary code of best practice for industry, addressing operational and non-operational risks and creating a minimum standard that could be adopted by issuers, irrespective of technology or market proposition.

== Role ==
The Electronic Money Association (EMA) is the trade body for electronic money issuers and innovative payment service providers including payment institutions, banks, and payment schemes. It provides members with a forum to share their experiences and expertise around issues that impact new means of payment. It has taken part in negotiating several payment-related European Directives, regulations and legislation. The association works to develop industry good practice in compliance and customer service.

== Structure ==
The Electronic Money Association meets and takes its decisions in plenary. All members have an equal say in discussions, in the activities of the association and in the decision-making process. Several standing subcommittees and ad hoc working groups exist to cover specialist areas of the industry and emerging issues. These report their findings into the plenary sessions. The sub-committees and working groups include:

- Money Laundering
- Fraud
- IT Security workgroup

Day-to-day activities are undertaken by the secretariat, which is appointed by members.

== Activities ==
Members of the Electronic Money Association and its subcommittees meet on a monthly basis in London. Additionally, the EMA organizes seminars and conferences:

- The first EMA Conference on The Revision of the E-money Directive was held in February 2006 in Brussels, Belgium.
- The second EMA Conference on Future of Payments in Europe was held in November 2007 in London, UK.
- The 3rd EMA conference on 'The European Payment Services Directive and the Global Regulation of Payments' took place on 24 November 2009 at the Marriott West India Quay in London, United Kingdom.
- The 4th EMA conference on 'The evolution of e-money and payment institutions: new opportunities, new challenges' was held on 29 and 30 November 2011 at the Crowne Plaza Brussels 'Le Palace' in Belgium.
- The 5th EMA conference is planned for late October 2015 and will be in Brussels, Belgium.

== See also ==
- Electronic money
- Payment Services Directive
- Single Euro Payments Area
