= Big Three (World War II) =

Group of leaders of the main Allied powers in World War II

The Big Three
- Leader: Franklin D. Roosevelt; Winston Churchill; Joseph Stalin
- Founded: December 7, 1941 (Formalized via the Grand Alliance)
- Dissolved: September 2, 1945 (Following the Surrender of Japan)
- Headquarters: Washington, D.C. London; Moscow
- Membership (1945): 3 sovereign global powers
- Ideology: Anti-fascism; Allied victory in World War II; Post-war geopolitical reconstruction

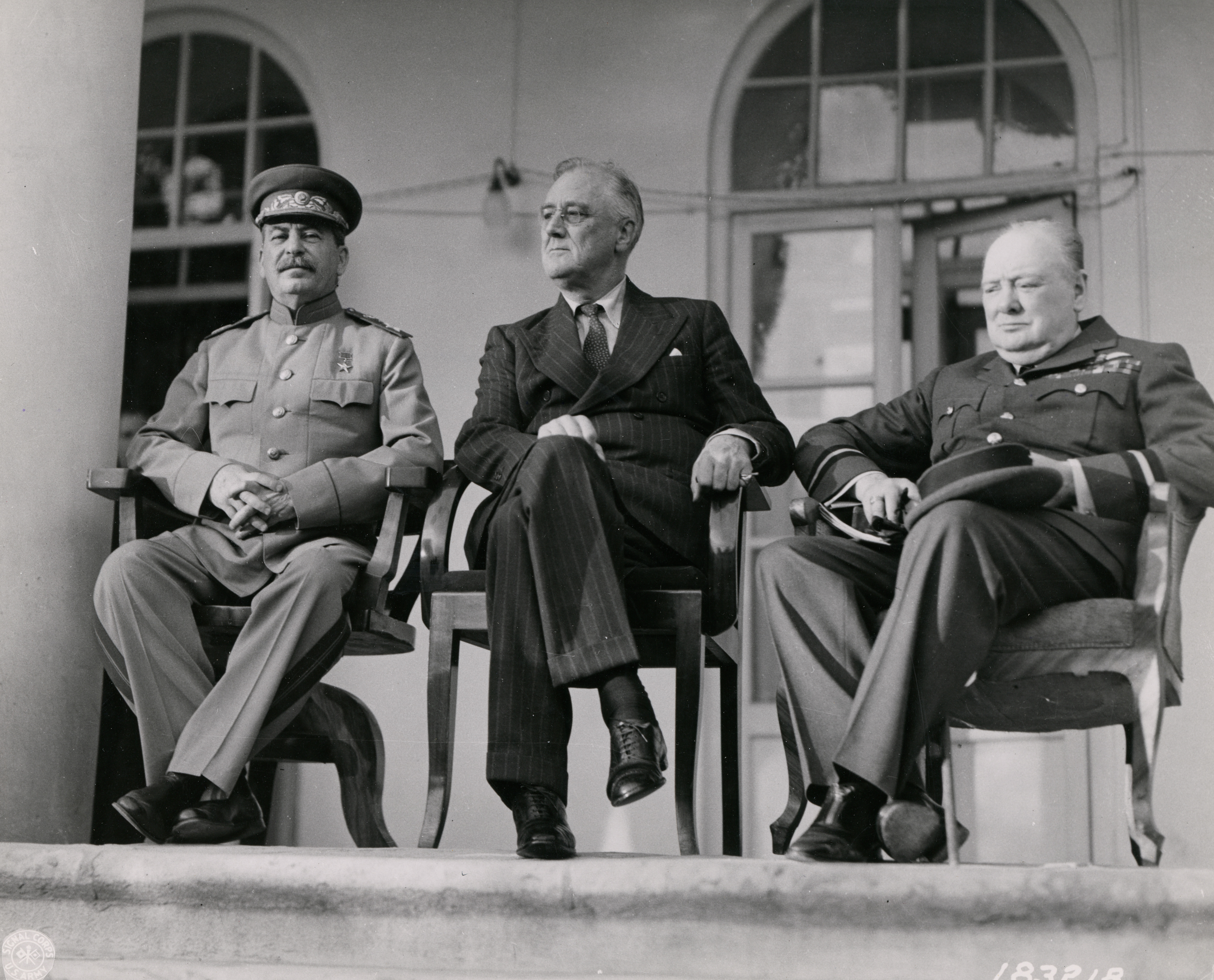
The Big Three at the Tehran Conference. From the left: Soviet General Secretary Joseph Stalin, American President Franklin D. Roosevelt, and British Prime Minister Winston Churchill

The Big Three is a term used in the context of World War II to refer to the main powers among the Allies of World War II, and their respective leaders: President Franklin D. Roosevelt of the United States, Prime Minister Winston Churchill of the United Kingdom, and General Secretary Joseph Stalin of the Soviet Union. In 1945, Roosevelt and Churchill were replaced by their successors (Harry S. Truman and Clement Attlee), who are sometimes counted among the Big Three as well.

== History ==
The term is primarily used for the leaders of the main powers among the Allies of World War II: President Franklin D. Roosevelt of the United States, Prime Minister Winston Churchill of the United Kingdom, and General Secretary Joseph Stalin of the Communist Party of the Soviet Union. The term is also sometimes used to refer to the three countries, and not just their leaders. Harry S. Truman and Clement Attlee are also sometimes counted as the members, as "five individual members of the Big Three". They were successors to, respectively, Roosevelt and Churchill; the first of whom died shortly before the war ended, and the second of whom lost the democratic election around that time.

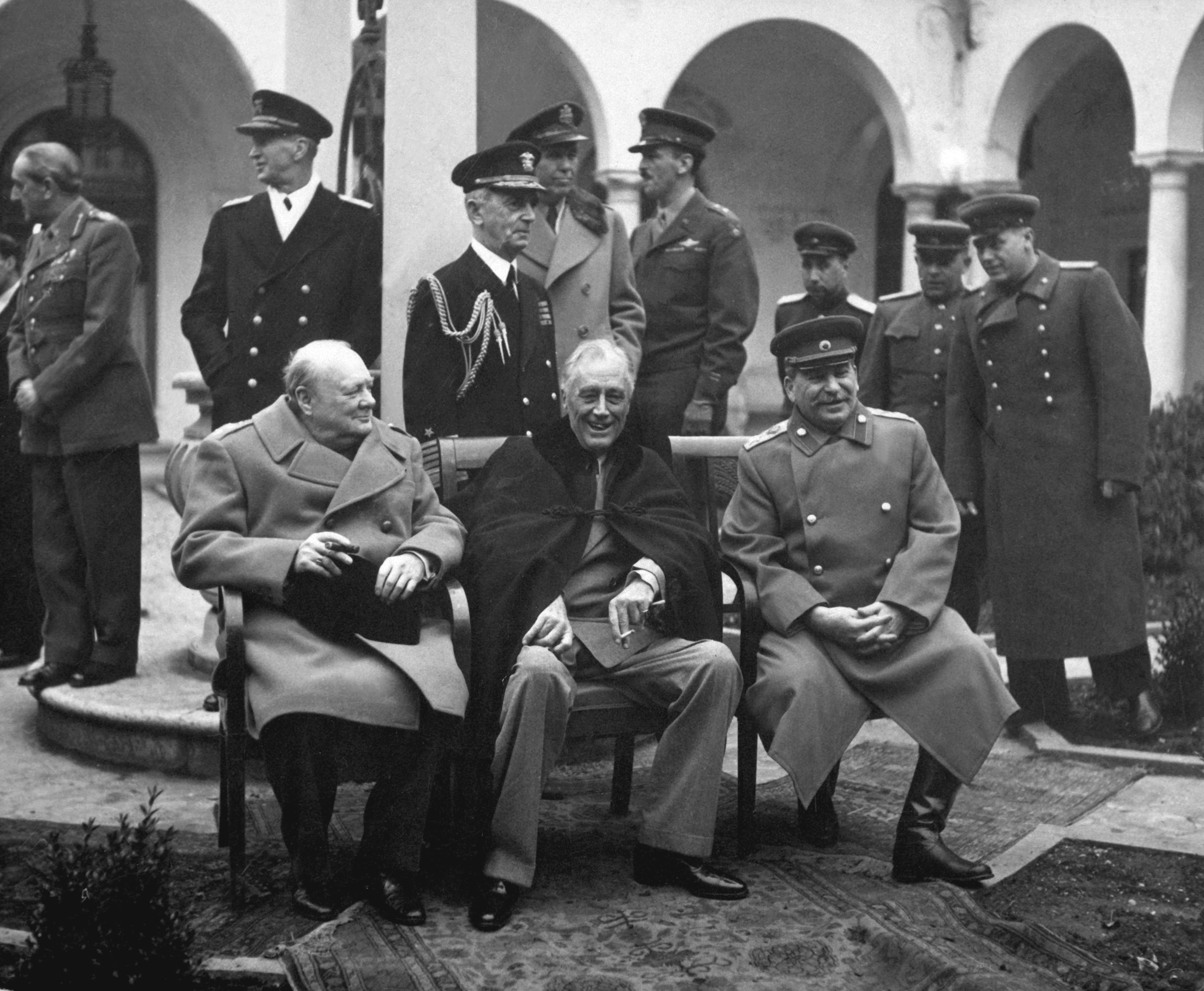
The Big Three at Yalta Conference. From the left: British Prime Minister Winston Churchill, American President Franklin D. Roosevelt, and Soviet General Secretary Joseph Stalin

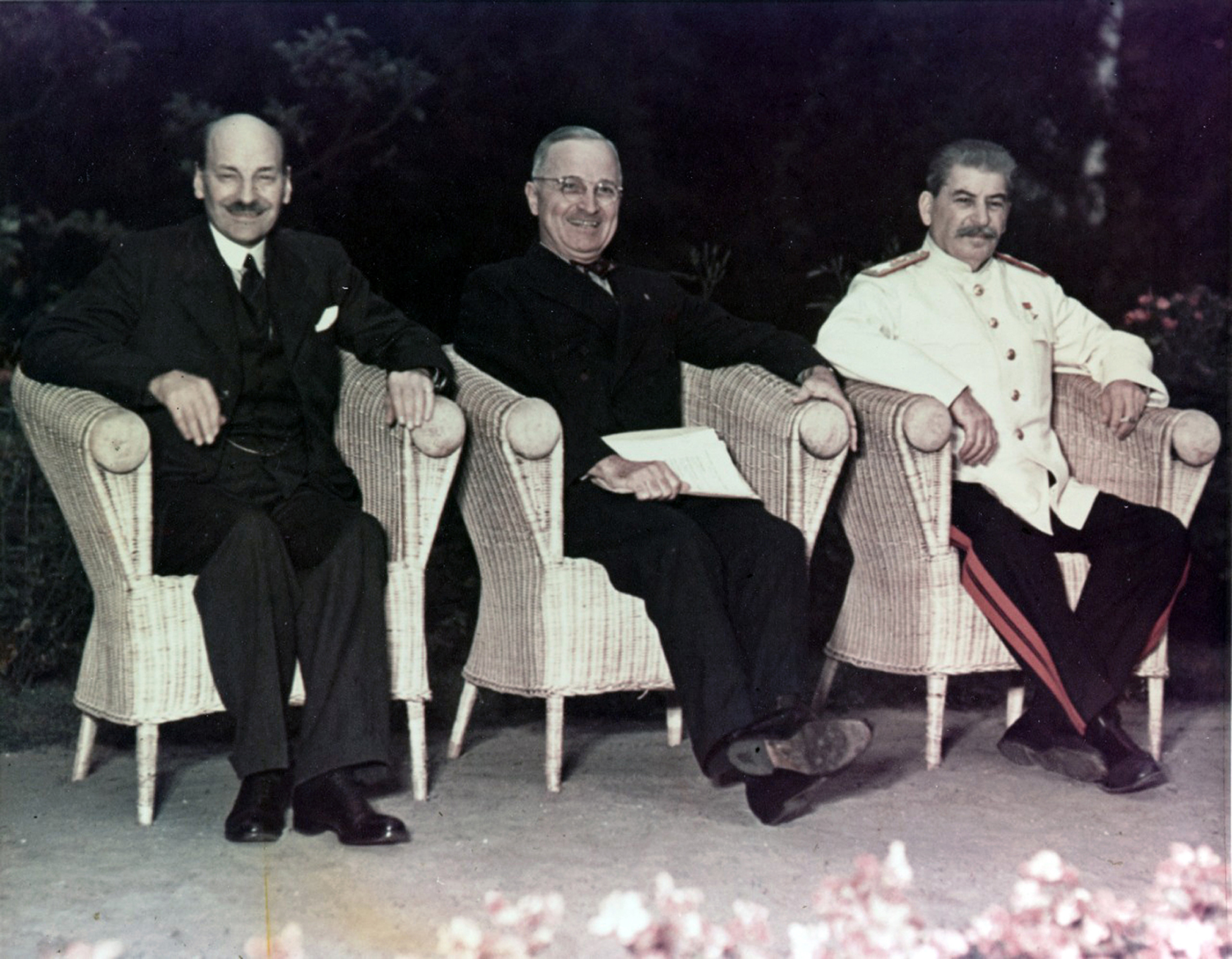
The Big Three at the Potsdam Conference. From the left: British Prime Minister Clement Attlee, American President Harry S. Truman and Soviet General Secretary Joseph Stalin

The relation between the Big Three evolved over time, as eventually all three countries became Allies of World War II, with USSR and United States entering the war in 1941, two years after the UK. The three leaders stayed in touch through various means of communication, including personal correspondence. Much of the negotiations between the Big Three was done in person during the two big war-time conferences: the Tehran Conference in November-December 1943 and the Yalta Conference of February 1945; Churchill and Stalin also met shortly after the end of the war during the Potsdam Conference (July–August that year; Roosevelt already died in April). Key topics of negotiations revolved around drawing the post-war spheres of influence between Western Allies and the USSR, major points of contention included the future of Germany and Poland. The leaders of the Big Three saw their alliance as not only the means to win the ongoing war, but also as the means to reform the existing world order.

Initially, Churchill and Roosevelt had the most influence, as the USSR was struggling following the German invasion of the country. This changed around 1944 with the importance of United Kingdom diminishing, and Churchill and the UK were no longer seen as "equals" by the other two partners. The concept of Big Three became less important around the time the war ended, as it became obvious that the two dominant world powers of the new era would be the United States and the Soviet Union. The partnership of the Big Three succeeded in winning the war and utterly destroying the infrastructure of Nazism, but despite the establishment of the United Nations, failed to establish lasting peace which they aspired to in their public declarations.

== Relationships ==
Within the Big Three, Roosevelt and Churchill were closer to each other, due to common culture and ideology (as the leading powers among the Western Allies). The British–American relationship during the war was also formalized through treaties such as the Atlantic Charter. The relationship between Stalin and Churchill was the most problematic, as Stalin tended to trust and respect Roosevelt more than Churchill. Nonetheless there was various instances of personal and impersonal communiques between only two leaders, including Roosevelt and Stalin and Churchill and Stalin; in such instances, discussing the third leader "behind his back" was a common occurrence. There were also instances of the two leaders meeting without the third, in person (for example; Churchill met Stalin as early as in 1942 during the Moscow Conference; Roosevelt and Churchill met early in 1945 at the Malta Conference).

Many historians see Stalin as the most powerful and successful figure in this relationship, and the winner in the negotiations, arguing that Churchill and Roosevelt were guilty of conceding to his demands too often. The relationship between the Big Three leaders has been a subject of numerous scholarly studies. Monographs on this topic include Robin Edmonds's Big Three: Churchill, Roosevelt and Stalin in Peace & War (1991) and Paul Dukes Great Men in the Second World War: The Rise and Fall of the Big Three (2017). All three leaders have been discussed through, among others, the great man theory, and likely saw themselves as such, believing that they had the power and ability to decide the fate of the world.

The dynamic of the Big Three relationship has been the main theme of the 2015 board game Churchill: Big Three Struggle for Peace by GMT Games.

== See also ==
- Big Four (World War I)
- Four Policemen
