= Cashless catering =

Catering with no cash at the time of purchase

Cashless catering is a prepay point of sale (POS) technology that allows transactions without the absence of cash at the time of purchase. It is used in canteens, particularly in schools. The use of the technology has expanded to include music festivals such as Ottawa Bluesfest and Wireless Festival, where the system has been integrated into RFID wristbands.

== System ==
Users of the system have a profile which stores information such as the account balance, personal details and a photograph for verification purposes. Cashless catering systems can use a variety of user identification methods, such as PIN entry, Fingerprint recognition, Magnetic stripe cards, Photograph recognition, Electronic fob and Smart cards

The cost to a British secondary school of setting up a cashless catering system was approximately £21,000 GBP in 2012; For primary schools it was £7,500. Systems require annual maintenance at approximately £2,500 for high schools and £1,000 for primary schools.

== Early Use ==
Cashless catering systems began to appear in UK schools during the mid-1990s, primarily as a means of reducing cash handling, improving service speed, and anonymising free school meal provision.

One of the earliest documented implementations took place in 1995 at St. Margaret’s Academy in West Lothian, Scotland, where a cashless catering system was introduced to remove cash from points of sale and reduce queuing times. The system was supplied by CRB Cunninghams, a UK-based education technology provider, and was designed to improve efficiency while addressing concerns around stigma associated with free school meals.

== See also ==
- Biometrics in schools
- Electronic money
