= Our Lady's High School, Broxburn =

Secondary school in Broxburn, Scotland

Coordinates: 55°55′57″N 3°28′57″W

Our Lady's High School, Broxburn was a Roman Catholic High School located in the western part of Broxburn, West Lothian in Scotland. The student occupied its premises beginning in 1969. It was a state-funded high school that educated Roman Catholic students mainly from the areas of Broxburn, Uphall, Uphall Station and Winchburgh. In 1983, the school had 400 students; prior to its closure there were about 100 students. The school's motto was 'Respice Stellam', Latin for look to the stars.

== Closure ==
In 1984, the Lothian Regional Council announced plans to close Our Lady's High School by 1986, a move opposed by parents of students. Talks continued into 1986 without resolution between the Roman Catholic church authorities and the regional education authority. In 1993 the council announced plans to amalgamate Our Lady's High and St Mary's Academy, Bathgate into one large purpose-built school in nearby Livingston. Both Our Lady's High and St Mary's adopted the new name, and both operated as St. Margaret's Academy for one year prior to their closure, before moving all schooling to Livingston. The Our Lady's High site eventually closed in 1994. The building was renovated in the late 1990s is now the site of Strathbrock Partnership Centre, a West Lothian Council one-purpose public services building used to accommodate a range of services such as housing, social work, a GP surgery, chemist and an adult education centre.
