= Blackburn, West Lothian =

Town in West Lothian, Scotland

Coordinates: 55.872°N 3.621°W

Blackburn: Scottish Gaelic: An Dubh Allt
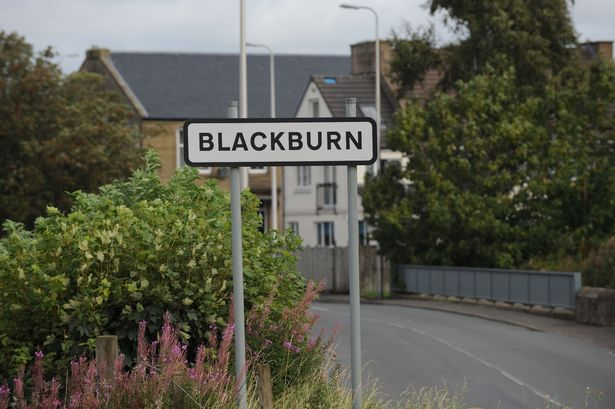
- The approach to Blackburn from the south

- Location within West Lothian
- Population: 5,730 (2020)
- OS grid reference: NS985655
- Civil parish: Livingston
- Council area: West Lothian
- Lieutenancy area: West Lothian
- Country: Scotland
- Sovereign state: United Kingdom
- Post town: BATHGATE
- Postcode district: EH47
- Dialling code: 01506
- Police: Scotland
- Fire: Scottish
- Ambulance: Scottish
- UK Parliament: Bathgate and Linlithgow
- Scottish Parliament: Linlithgow

Blackburn is a town in West Lothian, Scotland, near both Bathgate and Livingston, two of the larger towns in the county. It is situated approximately 20 miles (32 km) west of Edinburgh and 25 miles (40 km) east of Glasgow on the old A8 road.

== History ==
Blackburn means "the black stream", from the Old English blæc "black" and burna "stream". The name was recorded as Blachebrine in 1152. As a small industrial centre, Blackburn originally developed as a cotton-manufacturing town. In the mid-19th century, it became a centre for coal mining.

Its small population expanded rapidly from 4,302 in 1961 to around 9,000 by 1965 as a result of employment opportunities in Bathgate to the north and through in-migration following the inception of the Glasgow Overspill Plan.

The closure of the British Leyland plant in 1986 brought decline to the area, along with the destruction of many homes built during the 1960s.

The railway station at Bathgate attracts commuters to live in Blackburn and provides easy access to both Glasgow and Edinburgh.

== Blackburn House ==
Blackburn House is a category A-listed Georgian building, situated to the east of the town.

== Churches ==
Blackburn and Seafield Parish Church (Church of Scotland) is located in Blackburn. The congregation celebrated its centenary in 2008. Blackburn Gospel Hall (Christian Brethren) meets for worship services and Bible studies in a well-kept church building originally constructed as Blackburn's village school in the late 18th century. Our Lady of Lourdes, a Roman Catholic church located in Blackburn, also serves neighbouring communities and partners with a branch of the St. Vincent de Paul Society.

== Educational facilities ==
The village has the Roman Catholic secondary St. Kentigern's Academy, which serves students from the surrounding areas of West Lothian.

Blackburn is also in the catchment area of the non-denominational secondary Bathgate Academy, which is 2 miles (3 km) away.

The village also houses three primary schools: Murrayfield Primary, Our Lady of Lourdes Primary and Blackburn Primary as well as Pinewood school, a combination primary/secondary Additional needs school.

Formerly the village had its own Blackburn Academy, a non-denominational secondary school that also served students from the surrounding areas of West Lothian. However, the academy was closed in 1992 after several new non-denominational high schools had opened in nearby Livingston.

== Climate ==
Climate data for Blackburn (1991–2020)
Month	Jan	Feb	Mar	Apr	May	Jun	Jul	Aug	Sep	Oct	Nov	Dec	Year
Mean daily maximum °C (°F)	6.2 (43.2)	7.2 (45.0)	8.8 (47.8)	11.2 (52.2)	14.2 (57.6)	17.2 (63.0)	19.0 (66.2)	18.6 (65.5)	16.1 (61.0)	12.5 (54.5)	8.6 (47.5)	6.5 (43.7)	12.2 (54.0)
Mean daily minimum °C (°F)	0.4 (32.7)	0.7 (33.3)	2.0 (35.6)	2.9 (37.2)	5.9 (42.6)	8.4 (47.1)	10.1 (50.2)	10.0 (50.0)	8.3 (46.9)	5.3 (41.5)	2.8 (37.0)	0.2 (32.4)	4.8 (40.6)
Average rainfall mm (inches)	105.8 (4.17)	88.1 (3.47)	74.9 (2.95)	57.9 (2.28)	61.9 (2.44)	69.6 (2.74)	83.7 (3.30)	87.0 (3.43)	69.6 (2.74)	102.3 (4.03)	97.7 (3.85)	104.0 (4.09)	1,002.4 (39.46)
Average rainy days (≥ 1 mm)	15.3	13.2	12.6	11.1	11.1	11.8	12.6	12.5	12.1	15.0	14.9	15.4	157.6
Mean monthly sunshine hours	51.4	77.5	108.2	143.2	194.0	163.9	151.5	143.4	115.8	92.2	58.1	36.7	1,335.8
Source: Met Office

== Sport ==
=== Football ===
Blackburn is home to Scottish football club Blackburn United who play at the Purdie Worldwide Community Stadium (New Murrayfield Park) near the centre of the town and compete in the East of Scotland Football League Premier Division. The Club forms the pinnacle of the Blackburn United Community Sports Club.

=== Taekwondo ===
Blackburn was previously a big part of Scotia TaeKwonDo, when national competitions were regularly held in the Blackburn Community Centre which, before its demolition, was adjacent to New Murrayfield Park.

== Notable people ==
- Susan Boyle, singer who first came to fame as a contestant on Britain's Got Talent and whose 2009 debut album I Dreamed a Dream became the fastest selling UK debut album of all time.
- John Brown, footballer who attended Blackburn Academy and subsequently played for Rangers when the club won nine consecutive Scottish League titles.
- Angela Constance, Scottish National Party (SNP) politician and ex-Scottish Government Cabinet Minister.
- Steven Craig, footballer who, amongst others, played for Falkirk, Motherwell, Aberdeen and Dundee.
- Jim Devine, Labour politician who was convicted of fraud and jailed in the United Kingdom parliamentary expenses scandal
- Michael Gallagher, Australian paralympic gold medallist.
- Alexander Young (engineer), mechanical engineer born in the nineteenth century and who went onto become a politician in the Kingdom of Hawaiʻi.

== In British political culture ==
The town was notably mentioned in a famous speech by MP Tam Dalyell in the House of Commons on 14 November 1977 in which he posed what would become known as the West Lothian question.
