= James Orlin Grabbe =

American economist (1947–2008)

J. Orlin Grabbe
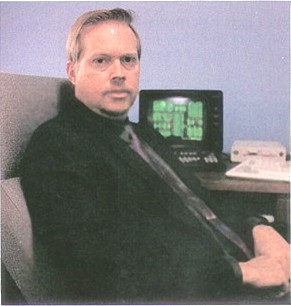
- J. Orlin Grabbe, 1990
- Born: October 8, 1947; Hale County, Texas, U.S.
- Died: March 15, 2008 (aged 60); San José, Costa Rica
- Education: Harvard University (Ph.D. 1981); UC Berkeley (B.A. 1976)
- Scientific career
- Fields: Financial economics, quantum physics

James Orlin Grabbe (/ˈɡreɪbiː/; October 8, 1947 – March 15, 2008) more commonly referred to as J. Orlin Grabbe, or just JOG, was an American economist and prolific writer with contributions in the theory and practice of finance. He was known by his book International Financial Markets, and for mathematical models for options and derivatives used in international finance and foreign exchange.

Grabbe wrote articles and essays about personal freedom and governmental abuse, and was an editor of Internet magazines such as the Laissez Faire City Times. Born and educated in the U.S., he pursued his business interests around the world. He died from heart failure around March 15, 2008 in San José, Costa Rica.

== Early life ==
Orlin Grabbe was born October 8, 1947, in Hale County, Texas, and grew up on a farm in Briscoe County in the Texas Panhandle. He showed great academic prowess in his youth and in response, he was invited to participate in nationwide, specialized education in mathematics. Two of his brothers also achieved doctorates and became professors. His brother Lester was a professor of theology at the University of Hull in England, while his brother Crockett was a professor of physics at the University of Iowa.

In the fall of 1966, Grabbe joined an older brother at the Worldwide Church of God's Ambassador College, based in Pasadena, California. He graduated in 1970 and served on the teaching staff until 1973. During this time, he was the editor of the student newspaper. In his memoir, written later in his life, he described not only his own experiences and thought processes, but also the atmosphere that permeated the college, its students, and the organization as a whole.

After leaving Ambassador, Grabbe enrolled at the University of California, Berkeley, to pursue his interests in research and science, with an emphasis in mathematics. In 1976, he received a Bachelor of Arts degree in economics. He continued his education at Harvard University where he was awarded a Ph.D. in economics in 1981.

Grabbe specialized in the study of financial derivative instruments and published important pricing models for futures, forward contracts and options, especially in the foreign exchange (FX) markets.

In 1995, Grabbe moved to Reno, Nevada.

== Professional career ==
=== Wharton School of Business ===
After graduating from Harvard, Grabbe accepted a position at the Wharton School of Business (University of Pennsylvania), working in the capacity of assistant professor in economics. Grabbe discovered that there was a lack of educational material for the emerging field of international finance and for the increased trading in financial derivatives created by this market. In 1986, he wrote International Financial Markets, which is used worldwide as an educational and professional reference of trading in derivatives. In the 1991 second edition of his International Financial Markets, Grabbe introduced the term regulatory arbitrage in the context of eurocurrency markets. One of Grabbe's students, Andrew Krieger, became a Bankers Trust FX trader and the author of The Money Bazaar.

=== FX Systems ===
As assistant professor in economics at Wharton, teaching traders, MBAs, financial regulators, policy makers, and "operatives of the future", Grabbe continued to develop the mathematical models of financial derivatives.

In 1985, Grabbe transformed his informal interactions and founded FX Systems Inc. with one of his students, Farid Naib. When FX Systems continued to grow, Grabbe resigned from Wharton, in order to focus on the further development of the software. FX Systems stayed at the forefront of the emerging markets for financial derivatives, acquiring financial institutions as customers.

In 1990, Grabbe sold his share of the company. The new owner, who was now partnered with Naib, ended up in disagreements, leading to a split of the company and the formation of FNX Limited, led by Naib. Until his death, Grabbe worked as a part-time consultant with FNX Limited. Under the umbrella of FNX, Grabbe created pricing models for complex derivatives, which were used by major banks around the world. FNX Limited has since become very successful in the market.

=== Kalliste Inc. ===
Based in the New York City neighborhood of Greenwich Village, Grabbe continued his professional career as a financial market consultant. He interspersed this time and furthered his interests in cultural expression by pursuing a formal education in media. In 1993, he created the company Kalliste Inc. and produced experimental films, as well as shows of fractal computer graphics. He also produced a CD, Cuba di mi Amor, featuring the Cuban pianist, Danilo Pina.

=== "The End of Ordinary Money" ===
Grabbe's cryptology-focused "The End of Ordinary Money" was published in the July 1995 edition of Liberty. In a second article, "Digital Cash and the Future of Money", Grabbe explored routes toward digital finance.

== 60 Minutes ==
Grabbe was not especially impressed by the efforts of market regulators and authorities, made apparent by the textual content in his book International Financial Markets. Grabbe reported that he received information from highly credible sources about unsavory acts made by highly placed persons in the marketplace. He stated that he was approached by official representatives seeking his assistance by covertly gathering financial information from his network of customers. Grabbe responded by gathering facts about these activities, albeit from the mindset of a researcher with an intent to reveal the activities of the market manipulators. His research led him to the serious study of cryptography, in an effort to discover ways to protect individuals from interference.

Some of Grabbe's investigations surrounding controversial current events, made direct contact with sources in government essential, which led to further investigations. The increasing popularity of the Internet made his articles (and essays) widely spread. Some of those published investigations are recognized today still as relevant, including his article "When Osama Bin Ladin Was Tim Osman".

Lesley Stahl of 60 Minutes, produced an investigative segment about misinformation on the Internet that aired on March 2, 1997. Grabbe was interviewed on the show and presented as a representation of misinformation found online. Her comments about the dangers of anyone being able to create content on the Internet, rather than relying on mass media, led to further commentary online.

In parallel, Grabbe also published philosophical essays written from a libertarian/rational-anarchist viewpoint about personal freedom and the perceived increasing threats. This was exemplified in 1993, in a speech to the Eris Society, entitled "In Praise of Chaos".

== Life in Costa Rica ==
=== Laissez Faire City Times ===
In November 1997, Orlin Grabbe was invited to edit an online weekly newspaper called the Laissez Faire City Times. The newspaper was loosely connected to the Laissez Faire City project based in Costa Rica. Grabbe relocated to Costa Rica the following year.

The Laissez Faire City Times grew in prominence, with many of its articles quoted and referenced by others, some even by mainstream media and academic papers. In line with his work on Digital Finance and its dependence on cryptography, Grabbe published several articles and tutorials in the Laissez Faire City Times and on his Internet homepage. The tutorials and especially the Java Encryption Source Code have been referenced by academic institutions and scholarly papers as recommended reading.

=== Digital Monetary Trust ===
In November 1999, a series of articles in the Laissez Faire City Times presented the Digital Monetary Trust project, which was a proposed financial trust providing private, anonymous accounts for individuals and entities within the DMT system, in order to securely store anonymous capital or to make anonymous monetary transactions.

That is, the DMT will be in the business of providing privacy, and doing so in a cryptographical framework which provides a more solid basis for customer anonymity than the traditional ones of (allegedly) tight-lipped bankers or (often-leaky) banking secrecy laws.

—Orlin Grabbe

=== Laissez Faire Electronic Times ===
In January 2002, Grabbe resigned as editor of the City Times and started a new weekly online newspaper, Laissez Faire Electronic Times, sponsored by the newly operational DMT. Grabbe continued publishing the same type of essays as before, with many of the same authors. In October 2001, he separated himself from connections to the Laissez Faire City project, which ended in spring 2002. As a consequence of the closure of Laissez Faire City, its participants dispersed and services to the group of initial users of DMT were discontinued.

Both DMT and the Laissez Faire Electronic Times were discontinued in 2004. At that time, the technological viability of Grabbe's proposals had been proven, not only in theory, but also in practice.

The Laissez Faire City Times and Laissez Faire Electronic Times paid writers for the right to edit and publish their articles, while each author retained the full copyright. When the publishers' sites were taken offline, in 2002 and 2004 respectively, direct access to these newspapers and all the articles ceased. (Note: Copies of some articles can still be found via search engines, or via web.archive.org, where an incomplete archive of these weekly newspapers can be found by searching for https://www.zolatimes.com, https://www.zolatimes2.com and http://freedom.orlingrabbe.com/lfetimes/lfetimes_index.htm.) Many still see these newspapers as important resources for highly valuable articles of philosophical and political significance in freedom-related and especially (but not exclusively) libertarian thought.

=== Chaos ===
Throughout Grabbe's works, "chaos" remained a recurring underlying theme. The study of chaotic disorder in the form of noise in market prices, guided his works on statistically based mathematical models for option pricing. The structured disorder of fractals fascinated him deeply and led him to begin writing a series of essays about Chaos & Fractals in Financial Markets, intended to be part of a future book; a sequel to International Financial Markets. In the last years, when heart problems began to dominate his life, he wrote and published his studies on e.g. game theory in the framework of quantum mechanics, itself a mathematical model of chaos in nature.

The unpredictability of random numbers was the basis for the cryptology needed for implementing the Digital Monetary Trust, as well as the basis for his politics and philosophy. The false dichotomy between Order and Chaos, where induced fears of the horrors of total chaos is the favorite tool of those who seek power to enforce their own order on others. Grabbe's position was made very clear in his own writings, as well as in his selection of articles and images from the web. His homepage was headed by deeply symbolic declarations, such as "Opposition to tyrants is obedience to God," or the summary of his mission statement, "... inspecting the global underbelly: privacy, money laundering, espionage." The speech In Praise of Chaos at the Eris Society, published on his Kalliste homepage was a personal declaration of independence, where if perhaps not seeking order out of chaos, at least the search of energy from the chaos was the choice apart from being subdued into lethargic subservience by the lack of entropy in stasis.

Grabbe underlined the importance of this anarchistic independence repeatedly on his homepage, showing his closeness to Discordianism and Church of the SubGenius, by the headline, "What forbids us to tell the truth, laughingly?" — Horace, Satires, I.24.

=== Physics ===
In 2005, Grabbe published a number of papers on quantum physics in arXiv.
