= E-Money Directive =

Regulation of electronic payments in EU

The E-Money Directive or the electronic money directive (2009/110/EC, originally 2000/46/EC) regulates electronic payment systems in the European Union. The aim is to enable new and secure electronic money services and to foster effective competition between all market participants.

As per Article 2(2) of Directive 2009/110/EC, “e-money” means “electronically, including magnetically, stored monetary value as represented by a claim on the issuer which is issued on receipt of funds for the purpose of making payment transaction, and which is accepted by a natural or legal person other than the electronic money issuer”. E-money is “technically neutral” (Article 7) and intended to serve as an “electronic surrogate for coins and banknotes” (Article 13). The European Commission describes e-money as a "digital alternative to cash". The European Central Bank accounts for e-money as "overnight deposits".

Because electronic money is technically neutral, it can be issued on different media including prepaid cards and electronic wallets. In 2019, Monerium became the first company authorized to issue e-money on blockchains. By mid-2024, blockchain-based spending accounts linked to Visa debit cards were available in Europe for initial customer testing.

== See also ==
- Payment Services Directive
- Digital currency
