= School of Biological Sciences, University of Manchester =

Biology school in English university

The School of Biological Sciences is a School within the Faculty Biology, Medicine and Health at the University of Manchester. Biology at University of Manchester and its precursor institutions (Victoria University of Manchester and UMIST) has gone through a number of reorganizations (see History below), the latest of which was the change from a Faculty of Life Sciences to the current School.

== Academics ==
=== Research ===
The School, though unitary for teaching, is divided into a number of broadly defined sections for research purposes, these sections consist of: Cellular Systems, Disease Systems, Molecular Systems, Neuro Systems and Tissue Systems. Research in the School is structured into multiple research groups including the following themes:

- Cell-Matrix Research (part of the Wellcome Trust Centre for Cell-Matrix Research)
- Cell Organisation and Dynamics
- Computational and Evolutionary Biology
- Developmental Biology
- Environmental Research
- Eye and Vision Sciences
- Gene Regulation and Cellular Biotechnology
- History of Science, Technology and Medicine
- Immunology and Molecular Microbiology
- Molecular Cancer Studies
- Neurosciences (part of the University of Manchester Neurosciences Research Institute)
- Physiological Systems & Disease
- Structural and Functional Systems

The School hosts a number of research centres, including: the Manchester Centre for Biophysics and Catalysis, the Wellcome Trust Centre for Cell-Matrix Research, the Centre of Excellence in Biopharmaceuticals, the Centre for the History of Science, Technology and Medicine, the Centre for Integrative Mammalian Biology, and the Healing Foundation Centre for Tissue Regeneration. The Manchester Collaborative Centre for Inflammation Research is a joint endeavour with the Faculty of Medical and Human Sciences of Manchester University and industrial partners.

=== Research Assessment Exercise (2008) ===
The faculty entered research into the units of assessment (UOA) for Biological Sciences and Pre-clinical and Human Biological Sciences. In Biological Sciences 20% of outputs were rated 4* (World Class) and 40% 3* (Internationally Excellent), for 107 category A staff. In the Pre-clinical unit, 20% were rated 4* and 45% 3*, for 72 category A staff. Quality assessment by Grade Point Average (GPA) ranks the faculty 3rd and 2nd in the UK for these units respectively.

== History of biological sciences at the Victoria University of Manchester and UMIST ==
=== Department of Zoology (Victoria University of Manchester, 1879–1986) ===
Zoology was taught at Manchester since the foundation of Owens College in 1851 when William Crawford Williamson was appointed professor of natural history with responsibilities to teach botany, physiology, geology and zoology. His teaching load was reduced by the creation of independent chairs in geology (1874), and zoology (1879).

Williamson embodied a traditional view of natural history, with its strong bias to taxonomic classification. From the 1860s onwards this approach began to change under the influence of German university biologists. The appointment of Arthur Milnes Marshall as professor of zoology at Owens in 1879 led to the adoption of this 'new biology' approach at Manchester. Marshall had been trained by these methods at the University of Cambridge. Marshall modernised the zoology curriculum, introduced courses in elementary biology and embryology, and lobbied for the establishment of dedicated research laboratories. In 1887, the Beyer laboratories were opened, funded by a local industrialist, C. F. Beyer; they were conveniently placed next to the Manchester Museum.

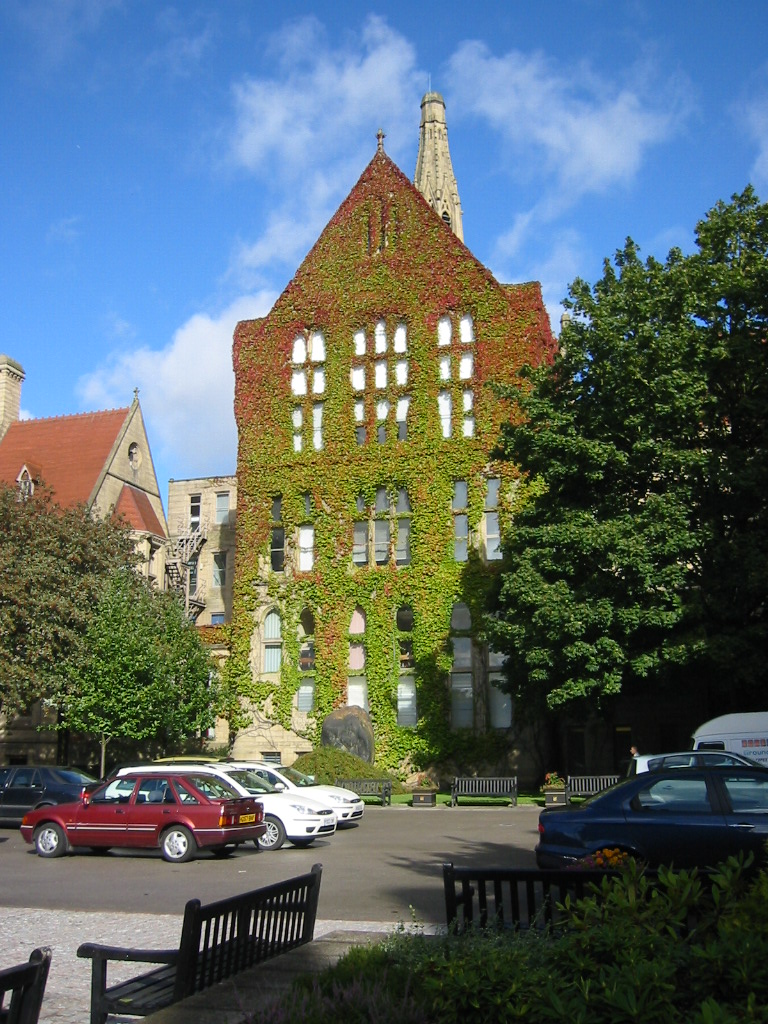
The Beyer Laboratories

Marshall's career ended when he was killed in a climbing accident.

Marshall was succeeded by Sydney Hickson in 1894 who held the chair until 1926. He was a marine zoologist and an expert in the study of corals. Under Hickson the department saw steady growth in staff and students, with the emergence of distinct research specialisms. On his retirement in 1926, he was succeeded by J. S. Dunkerly, a protozoologist and an authority on Flagellates from the University of Glasgow who died in 1931. Herbert Graham Cannon, previously professor of zoology at Sheffield, was elected to the Beyer chair in his place. In 1948 R. Dennell was appointed professor of experimental zoology. The current holder of the Beyer Chair is Professor Andrew Loudon, who studies biological clocks in animals.

During the 1960s and 1980s the work of the department included J. Gordon Blower's research on the population genetics of millipedes, RR Askew's work on parasitic and other insects, Derek Yalden's studies on the distribution of fauna in the Peak District National Park and the mammals of Ethiopia, Gabbutt's on the biology of the pseudoscorpions, R. D. Butler's on the contractile systems in protozoa, and Roger Wood's on the genetics of mosquitoes.

By the 1980s, it was recognised that some of the distinctions between the traditional biological disciplines were no longer as relevant as in the past and the university instituted a major review of the biological sciences at the university. A working party was established under Professor John Willmott that recommended greater integration in teaching and research between traditional biological disciplines, and a closer relationship between biological and medical departments. This led to the creation of a School of Biological Sciences in 1986, based on four divisions: biochemistry and molecular biology, cell and structural biology, environmental biology and physiological sciences. Nine departments of the faculties of science and medicine were abolished, including Botany and Zoology. Professor A. P. J. (Tony) Trinci (a microbiologist) was the first chairman of the School of Biological Sciences. Fourteen members of the Department of Botany joined the new division of cell and structural biology, and six became part of environmental biology.

Professors of zoology at the Victoria University of Manchester included

- Arthur Milnes Marshall, 1879–1893
- Sydney John Hickson, 1894–1926
- John S. Dunkerly, 1926–1931
- Herbert Graham Cannon, 1931–1963
- Ralph Dennell, 1963–1974 (professor of experimental zoology from 1948)
- Arthur Cain, 1964–1968
- Edwin Trueman, 1969–1982
- D. M. Guthrie, 1982–(?)

=== Department of Botany (Victoria University of Manchester, 1879–1986) ===
Botany has been also taught at Manchester since 1851 when William Crawford Williamson (1816–1896) was appointed as professor of natural history, anatomy and physiology. Williamson originally taught botany, zoology, geology and comparative anatomy. This teaching burden was reduced with the establishment of chairs in geology (1872) and zoology (1879), and with the creation of the Medical School in 1872 eventually allowing Williamson to concentrate on botany. As in zoology, there was an initial concentration on taxonomy until the newer systematic ideas took hold.

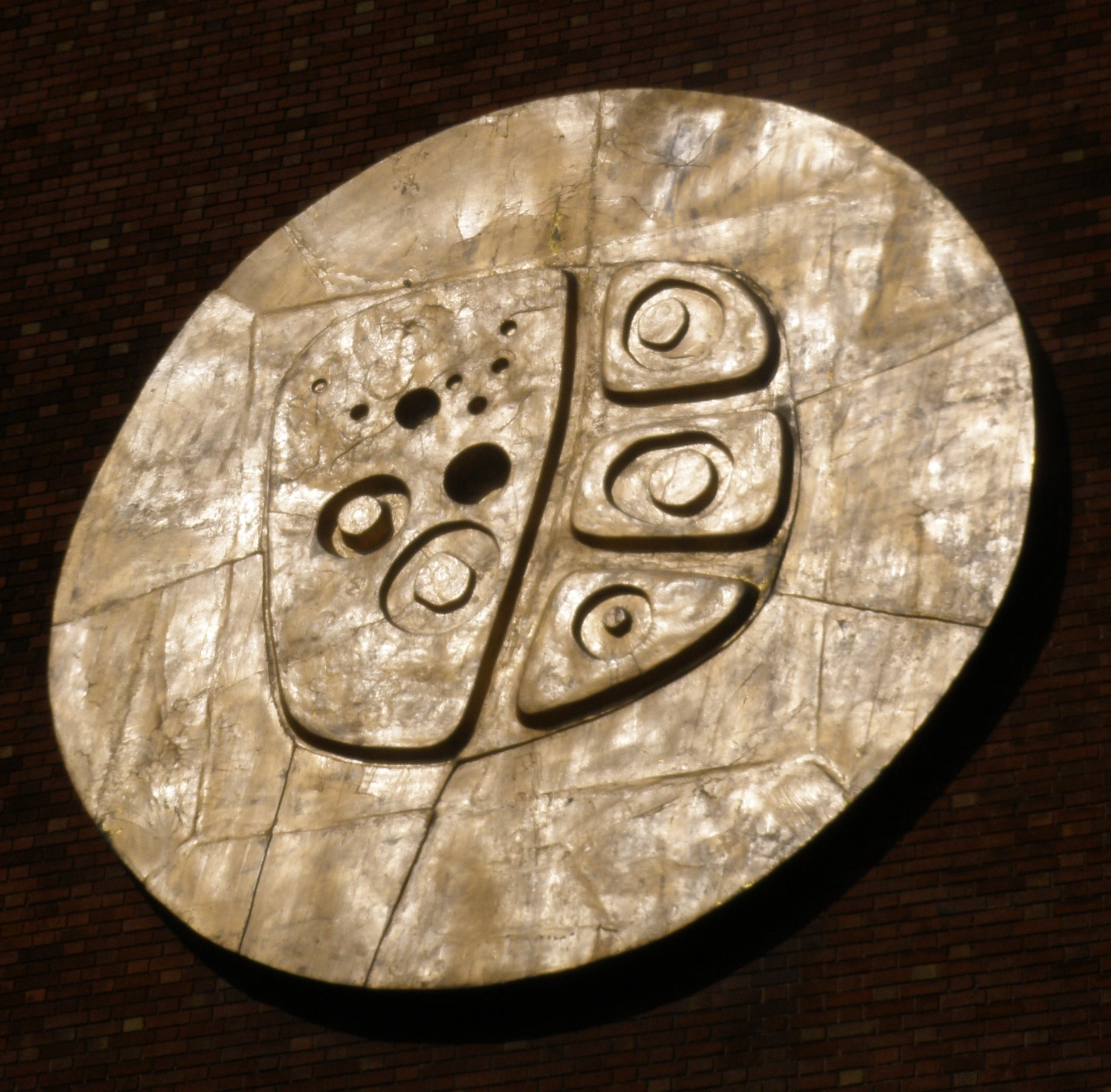
The sculpture on the Williamson Building

New botanical laboratories were added west of the Beyer building in 1911, including a physiological laboratory, and remained in use until the 1970s, when the department was transferred to the Williamson building.

In the 1930s research interests were developed in horticulture, assisted by funds from the Royal Botanical Society of Manchester. A plant geneticist F. W. Sansome (1902–1981) was appointed as lecturer in horticulture in 1935, and land was acquired at Jodrell Bank in Cheshire for experimental research in horticulture. This was later used as the site of the famous Jodrell Bank Observatory and Lovell Telescope.

On the formation of the new School of Biological Sciences fourteen members of the Department of Botany joined the new division of cell and structural biology, and six became part of environmental biology.

The named chairs on botany included:

Harrison Professors of Botany:

- William Crawford Williamson 1851–1892 (originally as professor of natural history)
- Frederick Ernest Weiss 1892–1930
- James Montagu Frank Drummond FRSE 1930–1946
- Eric Ashby 1946–1950
- S. C. Harland 1950–1958
- Claude Wardlaw 1958–1966
- David Henriques Valentine 1966–1979
- Elizabeth Cutter 1979–1989
- Simon Turner 2005-present

Barker Professors of Cryptogamic Botany:

- William Henry Lang 1909–1940
- Claude Wilson Wardlaw 1940–1958
- John Colhoun 1960–1980
- Anthony Peter Joseph Trinci 1981–2001

=== School of Biological Sciences (Victoria University of Manchester, 1986–2004) ===
In addition to the trend to a less compartmentalised approach to biology the government in the 1980s was cutting spending on universities but trying to preserve engineering and medicine. But ultimately the motivation for reform was an assessment by the UGC that was critical of all biological sciences in Manchester. While Physiology and Anatomy fared best they were only rated as 'Average'. Biochemistry, Botany, and Zoology were all 'Below Average', the lowest rank attributable. Biological science in Manchester not only ranked well below Cambridge, Oxford and the London Colleges but was also worse than its civic university competitors such as Liverpool and Leeds and as well as many newer universities such as Reading, Southampton, Swansea and Leicester.

A new School of Biological Sciences was created in 1986 with four new departments: Biochemistry and Molecular Biology, Cell and Structural Biology, Physiological Sciences, and Environmental Biology. In 1993 the departments were combined to create a single department school; Keith Gull, as Head of Biochemistry and Research Dean, was heavily involved in these developments. Concentration on the application of molecular biology techniques to address biological research issues led to a marked improvement in the levels achieved in research and, by extension, teaching as measured by external assessment. This was also reflected in a marked increase in funding from research councils and charities and in the higher profile life sciences gained within the university.

=== Department of Biomolecular Sciences (UMIST, 1959–2004) ===
Known by a number of names during its lifespan, the department was formed as the Department of Biochemistry, under Professor Alan Eddy, in 1959. It was created from the previously-existing Brewing Chemistry department. In the early 1980s the then novel discipline of molecular biology was introduced with the appointment of Paul Broda to a chair in this field, the department subsequently being known as Biochemistry and Applied Molecular Biology (BAMBi). The department was particularly strong in the molecular biology of yeast, under the direction of Stephen Oliver. In 1992 the Oliver group co-ordinated the production of the first complete DNA sequence of an entire chromosome, chromosome III of the yeast S. cerevisiae.

The prominence of molecular biology approaches and industrial relevance at UMIST acted to some extent as a paradigm for the reorganisation of biological sciences which took place in the second half of the 1980s and early 1990s at the Victoria University of Manchester; however, medical rather than industrial relevance was to take a more prominent role at the latter institution. Some medically relevant research was also carried out in the UMIST department, which had a leukaemia research unit and a group working on the molecular biology of malaria parasites.

During the 1990s biological sciences saw considerable expansion within UMIST, including the creation of new professorial chairs and the appointment of a considerable number of new lecturers. The disciplines of biotechnology and structural biology were especially prominent in the research interests of the new appointments. In this period the name of the department changed, once again, to 'Biomolecular Sciences' (BMS). The research strengths within the Life Sciences at UMIST and the Victoria University of Manchester had relatively limited overlap, and were to a degree complementary, when the merger of the two universities took place in 2004.

== Faculty of Life Sciences (UoM 2004-2016) ==
The Faculty of Life Sciences was one of the four faculties that comprised the University of Manchester. It was established in 2004 from the merger of its constituent departments: Biological Sciences and the Centre for the History of Science, Technology & Medicine in the Victoria University of Manchester and Biomolecular Sciences and Optometry & Neuroscience at UMIST. Uniquely for Manchester it was a faculty consisting of only one school.

On 25 June 2015 Manchester University announced the results of a review of the position of life sciences as a separate faculty. In August 2016 the faculty was dismantled in a restructuring exercise, reducing the number of faculties in the university from four to three. The majority of the personnel of the faculty were incorporated into a new Faculty of Biology, Medicine and Health, with a substantial minority moving to the Faculty of Science and Engineering.

The term Life sciences is generally understood to be wider than biology, including for example interdisciplinary areas that lie between biology and medicine. The inclusion of Optmetry and Neuroscience in the Faculty reflects this intention while some other areas generally included in a definition of Life Sciences, such as Biomedical Imaging and Pharmacy, are located in the Faculty of Medical and Human Sciences at Manchester.

As of 2008, the Faculty taught 2200 undergraduate students, had 467 postgraduate students and 270 academic staff. In the 2008 Research Assessment Exercise the Faculty came 3rd in the UK on the basis of Grade Point Average for Biological Sciences with 107 staff submitted, and 2nd in the UK for Preclinical and Human Biological Sciences with 72 staff submitted.

== Science communication and public engagement ==
=== The Life Sciences Podcast/Broadcast ===
The School of Biological Sciences had its own long-running podcast (and later video broadcast), where scientists within the faculty are interviewed about their research, as well as recently published high-impact papers, books and events they are involved with. Past guests include established researchers such as professor Daniel Davis, author of The Compatibility Gene', Dr David Kirby, author of Lab coats in Hollywood, Dr. Sheena Cruickshank, winner of the Society of Biology Science Communication award (2013) and nobel prize winner Sir John Sulston. The podcast also features interviews with budding new scientists within the school, including high-achieving undergraduates and PhD students, such as the Manchester iGEM team. The broadcasts later went on to explore broader themes within Life Sciences.
