= Botanical Society of Scotland =

National learned society for botanists of Scotland

The Botanical Society of Scotland (BSS) is the national learned society for botanists of Scotland. The Society's aims are to advance knowledge and appreciation of flowering and cryptogamic plants, algae and fungi. The Society's activities include lectures (mainly held in Edinburgh, but also in other Scottish cities), symposia, field excursions, field projects and an annual Scottish Botanist's Conference, held jointly with the Botanical Society of Britain and Ireland for exchange of information between botanists working in different areas. Its publications include a twice-yearly newsletter, BSS News, and a scientific journal, Plant Ecology & Diversity. The society is closely linked to the Royal Botanic Garden Edinburgh and the Scottish universities.

== History ==
It was founded on 8 February 1836 as the Botanical Society of Edinburgh. Its founding members included Prof Edward Forbes, Prof John Hutton Balfour and Dr Richard Parnell.

In 1935 the Botanical Society of Edinburgh incorporated the Cryptogamic Society of Scotland, founded in 1875, and included its name in its title. Its name changed again in 1991 to Botanical Society of Scotland, incorporating the Cryptogamic Society of Scotland. The Botanical Society of Scotland has been a charity registered in Scotland since 19 February 1918, and became a Scottish Charitable Incorporated Organisation (SCIO) (No. SC016283) on 15 April 2014.

== Activities ==
BSS is the only British botanical society with a keen interest in both flowering and non-flowering plants (e.g. ferns, mosses and algae) and fungi. This wide range of interest is reflected in its programme of monthly lectures during winter months, held mainly at the Royal Botanic Garden Edinburgh. Field meetings are held during summer and autumn to record both flowering and non-flowering plants all over Scotland. BSS also runs courses in special topics such as grass identification. An annual meeting, the Scottish Botanist's Conference is held each autumn, run jointly by BSBI, BSS and the Royal Botanic Garden Edinburgh. Symposia and conferences devoted to specific topics such as Plant Phenology are organised from time to time.

== Publications ==
The Botanical Society of Edinburgh published its first journal, Transactions of the Botanical Society of Edinburgh, from 1844 to 1990. In 1991, this was replaced with Botanical Journal of Scotland, published by Edinburgh University Press, to reflect the change of the society's name to "Botanical Society of Scotland" in the same year. In 2008, to give the journal an international appeal, Botanical Journal of Scotland was in turn replaced by Plant Ecology and Diversity, published by Taylor & Francis. Plant Ecology and Diversity was accepted for inclusion in Scopus in 2010 and it received its first impact factor, 2.053, in 2011.

== Presidents ==
Source (1836-1937):

Botanical Society of Edinburgh

- 1836-1839 : Prof. Robert Graham (1st President)
- 1839-1840 : Robert Kaye Greville (1st term)
- 1840-1841 : David Falconar
- 1841-1842 : Prof. Robert Christison
- 1842-1843 : Patrick Neill
- 1843-1844 : Prof. Robert Graham (2nd term)
- 1844-1845 : Andrew Douglas Maclagan (1st term)
- 1845-1846 : Prof. John Hutton Balfour (1st term), the driving force behind the establishment of the society
- 1846-1847 : Robert Kaye Greville (2nd term)
- 1847-1848 : Rev. Prof. John Fleming (1st term)
- 1848-1849 : Prof. John Hutton Balfour (2nd term)
- 1849-1850 : Rev. Prof. John Fleming (2nd term)
- 1850-1851 : Prof. John Hutton Balfour (3rd term)
- 1851-1852 : William Seller (1st term)
- 1852-1855 : Prof. John Hutton Balfour (4th term)
- 1855-1856 : Lt.-Col. Edward Madden
- 1856-1857 : Rev. Prof. John Fleming (3rd term)
- 1857-1858 : William Seller (2nd term)
- 1858-1859 : Andrew Murray
- 1859-1860 : Prof. George James Allman
- 1860-1861 : William H. Lowe
- 1861-1862 : Thomas Croxen Archer
- 1862-1863 : Prof. Andrew Douglas Maclagan (2nd term)
- 1863-1864 : Prof. John Hutton Balfour (5th term)
- 1864-1865 : Alexander Dickson (1st term)
- 1865-1866 : Robert Kaye Greville (3rd term)
- 1866-1867 : Isaac Anderson-Henry
- 1867-1868 : Charles Jenner
- 1868-1869 : Hugh Francis Clarke Cleghorn, the "father of Indian forestry"
- 1869-1870 : Sir Walter Elliot
- 1870-1871 : Alexander Buchan
- 1871-1872 : Prof. Charles Wyville Thomson
- 1872-1873 : James McNab
- 1873-1877 : Sir Robert Christison, Bt.
- 1877-1879 : Thomas Alexander Goldie Balfour
- 1879-1880 : William Gorrie
- 1880-1882 : Prof. Isaac Bayley Balfour (1st term)
- 1882-1884 : William Brack Boyd
- 1884-1887 : Prof. Alexander Dickson (2nd term)
- 1887-1889 : William Craig
- 1889-1891 : Robert Lindsay
- 1891-1893 : David Christison
- 1893-1895 : Prof. Frederick Orpen Bower
- 1895-1897 : Andrew Peebles Aitken
- 1897-1899 : William Watson
- 1899-1901 : Rev. David Paul
- 1901-1902 : Col. Fred Bailey, R.E.
- 1902-1904 : Prof. James William Helenus Trail
- 1904-1906 : Prof. Isaac Bayley Balfour (2nd term)
- 1906-1908 : J. Rutherford Hill
- 1908-1910 : Thomas Bennet-Clark
- 1910-1912 : Albert William Borthwick
- 1912-1913 : Sir Archibald Buchan-Hepburn, Bt.
- 1913-1915 : R. Stewart MacDougall
- 1915-1917 : Robert Alexander Robertson
- 1917-1920 : James Whytock
- 1920-1922 : William Gardner Smith
- 1922-1925 : Prof. William Wright Smith (1st term)
- 1925-1927 : Prof. James Montagu Frank Drummond
- 1927-1929 : Col. John Sutherland
- 1929-1931 : J. Rutherford Hill
- 1931-1933 : William Young
- 1933-1935 : Malcolm Wilson
- 1935-1937 : Prof. Sir William Wright Smith (2nd term)
- 1937-1939 : Alexander Cowan
- 1939-1942 : James Robert Matthews
- 1942-1943 : Robert James Douglas Graham
- 1943-1945 : Edward Wyllie Fenton
- 1945-1947 : James Wyllie Gregor
- 1947-1950 : Elizabeth (Helen) May Knox
- 1950-1951 : Prof. Sir William Wright Smith (3rd term)
- 1951-1953 : John Macqueen Cowan
- 1953-1955 : William Burns
- 1955-1957 : James Alexander MacDonald
- 1957-1960 : Harold Roy Fletcher
- 1960-1962 : Anna M. Macleod
- 1962-1964 : Prof. John Walton
- 1964-1966 : Douglas Mackay Henderson
- 1966-1968 : J. Grant Roger
- 1968-1970 : Prof. Robert Brown
- 1970-1972 : David Hugh Neven-Spence
- 1972-1974 : Brian Lawrence Burtt
- 1974-1976 : W.W. Fletcher
- 1976-1978 : Dr Adrian F. Dyer
- 1978-1980 : William W. Gauld
- 1980-1982 : Prof. Robert MacGregor Martyn Crawford
- 1982-1984 : Prof. Charles Henry Gimingham
- 1984-1986 : Roy Watling
- 1986-1988 : Prof. John Albert Raven
- 1988-1990 : Philip Morgans Smith

Botanical Society of Scotland (1990-)

- 1990-1992 : Dr James H. Dickson
- 1992-1994 : Miss J. Muscott
- 1994-1996 : Dr Kwiton Jong
- 1996–1998 : Prof. John Proctor
- 1998-2000 : Prof. Elizabeth Cutter
- 2000-2002 : Dr George Argent
- 2002-2004 : Mr Philip Lusby
- 2004-2006 : Dr Douglas Malcolm
- 2006-2008 : Prof. Richard Abbott
- 2008-2010 : Dr Christopher Jeffree
- 2010-2012 : Dr Barbara Sumner
- 2012-2017 : Prof. John Grace
- 2017-2019 : Dr Brian Ballinger
- 2019-2021 : Dr Julia Wilson
- 2021–2023 : Dr Jill Thompson
- 2023-2026 : Prof. Jonathan Silvertown
- 2026-present : Prof. Thomas Meagher

== Other notable members ==
- Albert, Prince Consort
- Queen Victoria, the society's first patron
- Alexander Adie
- Alexander von Humboldt
- Cardale Babington
- William Brand, founder member
- Robert Brown
- Alexander Bryson
- William Carruthers
- Thomas Frederic Cheeseman
- Charles Darwin, author of On The Origin of Species
- Job Bicknell Ellis
- Godfrey Howitt
- Edward Janczewski
- Paul Gordon Jarvis FRS, plant ecologist, Professor of Forestry and Natural Resources at the University of Edinburgh
- George Lawson, the "father of Canadian botany", was assistant secretary and curator of the society
- Lars Levi Læstadius
- Duncan Napier
- Robert Thomson, pioneer of sanitation
- Göte Turesson
- Charles Wyville Thomson, chief scientist on the Challenger Expedition
- Katherine Sophia Kane, the first elected female member of the society
- Prince Philip, Duke of Edinburgh, Honorary Fellow

== See also ==
- Flora of Scotland
- Royal Caledonian Horticultural Society
- Scottish Natural Heritage
