= Alison Hester =

British ecologist

Alison Hester FRSB
- Education: King's College London (BSc), University of Aberdeen (PhD)
- Scientific career
- Workplaces: CSIRO; James Hutton Institute
- Thesis: Vegetation succession under developing birch woods (1988)

Alison Hester is an ecologist in the UK, a professor at the Aberdeen site of the James Hutton Institute, Scotland, and an expert in the effects of land management on biodiversity.

== Education and career ==
Hester was educated at King's College London, she then did a PhD at the University of Aberdeen and was a Royal Society Postdoctoral Fellow at CSIRO Western Australia.

Her research looks at natural resource management and effects on biodiversity; her work has raised awareness of issues affecting woodland such as habitat fragmentation and invasive species such as bracken, and has shown that it is important to consider cultural context in land management for example the management of moorland for grouse shooting.

== Books ==
Chapter 5 Threatened Habitats: Marginal Vegetation in Upland Areas, with Rob Brooker, in Biodiversity Under Threat, edited by R E Hester, R M Harrison, published by the Royal Society of Chemistry in 2007.

Chapter 9 Plant traits, Browsing and Grazing Herbivores, and Vegetation Dynamics, with Christina Skarpe, in The Ecology of Browsing and Grazing, edited by Gordon, Iain J., Prins, Herbert H.T., published by Springer in 2008.

== Awards and honours ==
- Gave the British Ecological Society's '12 Months in Ecology' plenary lecture at their 2016 Annual Meeting
- Recognised by Visit Aberdeenshire for bringing an academic conference to North East Scotland thus supporting the local economy.
- Awarded an Honorary Fellowship of the Royal Scottish Geographical Society in 2019.
- Chair of the Natural Capital Initiative.
- Fellow of the Royal Society of Biology.
