= Alexander Boyd Stewart =

Scottish organic chemist and agriculturalist

Prof Alexander Boyd Stewart CBE FRSE FRIC (1904–1981) was a 20th-century Scottish organic chemist and agriculturalist. He was president of the British Society of Soil Science.

== Life ==
He was born on 3 November 1904 at Tarland in Aberdeenshire, the son of Donald Stewart, a farmer. He was educated at Robert Gordon's College in Aberdeen. He then studied science at Aberdeen University graduating MA in 1925 and BSc in 1928. He then continued as a postgraduate, gaining his doctorate (PhD) in 1932. He immediately obtained a post as Head of the Soil Fertility Department at the Macaulay Institute. Remaining at the institute he became its deputy director in 1954.

In 1955 he was elected a Fellow of the Royal Society of Edinburgh. His proposers were Donald McArthur, David Cuthbertson, A. T. Phillipson, Thomas Phemister, James Robert Matthews and Murray Macgregor.

In 1958 he left to become professor of agriculture at Aberdeen University. He was created a Commander of the Order of the British Empire (CBE) in 1962. He returned to the Macaulay Institute in 1964 as its director.

He retired in 1968 and died at his home, 3 Woodburn Place (a 1980s bungalow) in Aberdeen on 27 February 1981.

== Family ==
In 1939 he married Alice F. Bowman.

== Publications ==
- Soil Fertility Investigations in India (1946)
- Agriculture in the University of Aberdeen (1959)
