= Robert Lyell Mitchell =

Scottish chemist and mountaineer

Robert Lyell Mitchell FRSE FRSC (3 June 1910 – 7 February 1982) was a Scottish chemist and mountaineer. He was an expert on trace elements in soil and their effect on grazing animals, and served as the Director of the Macaulay Institute for Soil Science. He was simply called Bob Mitchell.

== Life ==
He was born in Edinburgh on 3 June 1910 the son of David Hay Lyell Mitchell, an engineer based at Bangour Hospital. He was educated at Bathgate Academy then studied science at the University of Edinburgh graduating with a BSc in 1931. He undertook postgraduate studies in chemistry first at the University of Aberdeen gaining a PhD in 1934, and then the Technische Hochschule in Zürich in Switzerland, where he developed a passion for alpine climbing.

In 1937 he became Head of Spectrochemistry at the Macaulay Institute and in 1968 was promoted to be its director.

In 1955 he was elected a Fellow of the Royal Society of Edinburgh. His proposers were Donald McArthur, Sir David Cuthbertson, Andrew Phillipson, Thomas Phemister, James Robert Matthews and Murray Macgregor.

He retired in 1975 and died in Aberdeen on 7 February 1982. He was unmarried and had no children.

== Publications ==
- The Spectrographic Analysis of Soils, Plants and Related Materials (1956)
