= Sansome =

Sansome is a surname. Notable people with the surname include:

- Eva Sansome (1906–2001), British mycologist
- F. W. Sansome (1902–1981), British botanist
- Paul Sansome (born 1961), English footballer

== See also ==
- Sansom
