= Aberdeen Research Consortium =

Scottish university alliance

The Aberdeen Research Consortium (ARC) is an alliance of Universities, Research Institutes and other institutions carrying out research-centred organisations in Aberdeen, Scotland.

The fundamental role of ARC is:

- to co-ordinate the research activities of its members
- to exploit and optimise research potential and
- to add value to that provided by individual institutions.

These objectives are achieved by identifying new collaborative research opportunities and ensuring that there is a co-ordinated, strategic approach to utilisation and development of research facilities and equipment. In addition, ARC facilitates the co-ordination of research administration, including commercial exploitation of research, human resources and staff development and training.

They are:

- University of Aberdeen
- The Rowett Research Institute
- Macaulay Land Use Research Institute
- Fisheries Research Services
- The Robert Gordon University
- NHS Grampian
- Scottish Agricultural College
- Biomathematics & Statistics Scotland

== Torry Food Science Laboratory Taskforce ==
In June 1995, the ARC set up a taskforce to prevent the Torry Food Science Laboratory being relocated from Aberdeen to York. In July of that year, the taskforce (headed by Hugh Pennington) presented its proposals to Douglas Hogg, the Secretary of State for Agriculture. Hogg confirmed that the laboratory would close in 1996, but an announcement "on the consequential changes for the work currently undertaken by the laboratory" would be made shortly thereafter. The following October, it was announced that the ARC's argument that "[The Torry site's] work could be retained in Aberdeen without the need for extra funds" was accepted in part by Hogg, and that the scientific posts will be distributed equally between York and Aberdeen.
