= Donald Webley =

Dr Donald Webley FRSE FIB
- Born: January 24, 1916; Merthyr Tydfil, Wales
- Died: August 25, 1990 (aged 74); Sutton Coldfield
- Education: University of Wales
- Known for: The Microbiology of Composting
- Spouse: Evelyn Rosa
- Scientific career
- Fields: Microbiology
- Institutions: Macaulay Institute for Soil Research
- Author abbrev. (botany): D. M. Webley

Dr Donald Martin Webley FRSE FIB (1916–1990) was a 20th-century British microbiologist. In authorship he is usually known as D. M. Webley.

== Life ==
He was born in Merthyr Tydfil in Wales on 24 January 1916, the son of Ernest Stanley Webley and his wife, Nellie May. He was educated there then studied Science at the University of Wales graduating BSc in 1937. Continuing as a postgraduate he gained an MSc then a doctorate (PhD) in 1941.

From 1945 to 1975 he was Head of the Macaulay Institute for Soil Research in Aberdeen

In 1968 he was elected a Fellow of the Royal Society of Edinburgh. His proposers were John Bacon, James Shewan, Percy Wragg Brian and Alexander Boyd Stewart.

He died at Sutton Coldfield on 25 August 1990.

== Family ==
In 1947 he married Evelyn Rosa.

== Publications ==
- The Microbiology of Composting (2 vols) (1947 and 1948)
- A Convenient Shaking N=Machine for Growing Micro Organisms (1955)
- The Microbiology of Rocks and Weathered Stones (1963)
