= David H. N. Spence =

Scottish botanist (1925–1985)

David Hugh Neven Spence FSA Scot FRSE (2 May 1925 – 23 April 1985) was a 20th-century Scottish botanist. In authorship he is known as David H. N. Spence or D. H. N. Spence.

== Life ==
He was born on 2 May 1925 in Sleaford in Lincolnshire the son of Mary Joyce Mallorie Walton and her husband, Dr Thomas Reginald Cardwardine Spence MD. His family moved to Edinburgh and he was educated at Edinburgh Academy 1933 to 1935, then at Clifton Hall School 1935 to 1938 and finally at Glenalmond College in Perthshire 1938 to 1942.

In the Second World War he joined the Royal Artillery in the summer of 1942 and then was commissioned into the Royal Scots, serving in Germany in 1945. He was demobbed in 1946 and then studied botany at the University of Edinburgh graduating with a BSc in 1951. He began lecturing at the University of Glasgow in 1952 and gained his doctorate (PhD) there in 1956. In 1957 he began lecturing in botany at the University of St Andrews. From 1962 to 1966 he had a prolonged secondment in Makerere College in Uganda.

In 1968 he was elected a Fellow of the Royal Society of Edinburgh. His proposers were James A. MacDonald, John Harrison Burnett, John Walton and Paul Weatherley. He was President of the Botanical Society of Edinburgh.

In 1977 he became Professor of Botany at the University of St Andrews.

He died in Dundee on 23 April 1985. He is buried in the St Andrews Western Cemetery on the Strathkinnes Road.

== Family ==
In 1952 he married Dorothy Jean Halliday.
