= William Brand (disambiguation) =

William Brand may refer to:

- William Brand, (1888–1979), Australian politician
- William H. Brand, (1824–1891), New York politician
- William Brand (botanist), (1807–1869), Scottish botanist
