= James Baird (British Army officer) =

Lieutenant-General Sir James Parlane Baird KBE CStJ FRCP FRCPE (12 May 1915 – 26 May 2007) was a British Army officer and doctor. He served as Director General Army Medical Services from 1973 to 1977.

== Early life ==
Baird was born on 12 May 1915 in Morayshire, Scotland. His father, the Rev David Baird, was a minister of the United Free Church of Scotland. He was educated at Bathgate Academy, a school in Bathgate, West Lothian. He studied medicine at the University of Edinburgh. He graduated in 1937 Bachelor of Medicine, Bachelor of Surgery (MB ChB).

== Military career ==
Baird had originally hoped to join the Royal Navy (RN) but with the outbreak of the Second World War in September 1939 he joined the British Army instead. He was commissioned into the Royal Army Medical Corps (RAMC) on 12 December 1939 with the rank of lieutenant, with his service number being 115469. He was initially posted to a field ambulance unit in Scotland, and was promoted to captain on 12 December 1940. In 1941, he was posted to the Middle East as a regimental medical officer with No. 11 (Scottish) Commando, part of the Layforce. The unit was disbanded later that year after taking heavy casualties in Lebanon. He then joined the Eighth Army, serving in field medical units during the Western Desert campaign. He transferred from a short service to a regular commission on 12 December 1944. He spent the later part of the war serving in military base hospitals; specifically in Suez, Cairo and Malta.

Following the war he specialised in tropical medicine. He became a Member of the Royal College of Physicians of London in 1946 and a Member of the Royal College of Physicians of Edinburgh in 1947. He was promoted to major on 12 December 1947. From 1947 to 1948, he was Officer-in-Charge of the medical division of Cambridge Military Hospital, Aldershot Garrison. He served in Austria from 1948 to 1949 and in 1950 he was on exchange to the Medical Corps of the US Army based in Texas. In 1952, he was elected Fellow of the Royal College of Physicians of Edinburgh. On 4 September 1958, he was promoted to lieutenant colonel. He completed his Doctor of Medicine (MD) degree from the University of Edinburgh in 1958. In 1959, he was elected Fellow of the Royal College of Physicians of London. He was promoted to colonel on 12 December 1962.

He was appointed Professor of Military Medicine at the Royal Army Medical College in 1965. From 1967 to 1969, he was based in West Germany as a consultant physician with the British Army of the Rhine. He was granted the acting rank of major-general on 7 January 1969. He served as Director of Medicine from 1969 to 1971. He returned to the Royal Army Medical College on 9 July 1971 as Commandant and Director of Studies. On 5 April 1973, he was appointed Director General Army Medical Services and granted the acting rank of lieutenant-general. He was promoted to lieutenant-general on 29 May 1973.

He retired from the British Army on 30 March 1977.

== Later life ==
Following his retirement from the military, Baird continued his involvement in postgraduate medical education. He was a medical adviser to the Council for Postgraduate Medical Education and deputy director of the British Postgraduate Medical Centre. He retired in 1984.

He died on 26 May 2007. His funeral was held at St Stephen's Church, South Dulwich, London on 6 June 2007.

He is survived by his daughter, Fiona, and his son, Alastair. His grandson, named James after him, is also a doctor.

== Honours and decorations ==
Baird was mentioned in dispatches on 13 January 1944 'in recognition of gallant and distinguished services in the Middle East'.

In June 1966, he was appointed Officer of the Venerable Order of Saint John (OStJ). In April 1972, he was promoted to Commander of the Venerable Order of Saint John (CStJ). In the 1973 Queen's Birthday Honours, he was appointed Knight Commander of the Order of the British Empire (KBE).
