= Sydney Harland =

Agricultural botanist and geneticist (1891–1982)

Sydney Cross Harland FRS FRSE (1891–1982) was a British agricultural botanist with considerable international experience. His area of expertise was especially in the growing of cotton.

== Early life and education ==
Sydney Cross Harland was born in Snainton in Yorkshire on 19 June 1891, the son of Erasmus Harland and his wife Eliza. He was educated at the municipal secondary school in Scarborough, North Yorkshire.

He studied sciences with a focus upon geology at King's College London graduating BSc in 1912 and gaining a doctorate (DSc) in 1919.

Harland was elected to membership of the Manchester Literary and Philosophical Society on 19 October 1920.

== Career ==
In 1922, he left Britain to take up a teaching role in the Danish-owned island of St Croix (now part of the US Virgin Islands). In 1923, he became professor of botany at the Imperial College of Tropical Agriculture in Trinidad and Tobago. In 1926, he also became director of the Cotton Research Station in Trinidad, continuing in this role until 1935. In 1940, he moved to Peru as director of the Institute of Genetics within the National Agricultural Society of Peru.

He returned to Britain in 1949 as a reader in botany at the University of Manchester, being made the George Harrison Professor of Botany at the University of Manchester the following year, 1950, and retaining this post until 1958, when he was subsequently made an emeritus professor.

He was made a Fellow of the Royal Society in 1943. In 1951, he was elected a Fellow of the Royal Society of Edinburgh. His proposers were Claude Wardlaw, Herbert Graham Cannon, William Black and William Robb.

In 1952, a paper published by Kathleen Basford on a cross-species of fuchsia which indicated the species had existed before the separation of landmasses 20-30 million years ago spurred him to offer her a job at the university. The two worked together at the university, including traveling to Peru together to breed maize.

== Personal life ==
He married Emily Wilson Cameron in 1915. They had two daughters but divorced and, in 1934, he married Olive Sylvia Atteck from a wealthy Trinidad family. Their son became a professor of child health in the West Indies. Another son of his is the psychologist Richard Lynn.

He died in Snainton on 8 November 1982.

== Publications ==
- The Genetics of Cotton (1939)
