= Kathleen Basford =

British botanist and geneticist (1916–1998)

- Born: 6 September 1916; Grantham, Lincolnshire, England
- Died: 20 December 1998 (aged 82)
- Education: University of Manchester
- Scientific career
- Fields: Botany
- Academic advisors: S C Harland

Kathleen Basford (6 September 1916 – 20 December 1998) was a British botanist, with a special interest in genetics. She is known for discovering a form of fuchsia that was a cross between a New Zealand and Mexican fuchsia, proving this form of flower existed 20–30million years ago, before the continents had separated.

== Life ==
Basford was born in Grantham in 1916 and developed her interest in botany from her nanny, Winny, who taught her how to identify types of trees and wildflowers.

She studied at Harrogate Ladies College where biology was not on the curriculum. She then studied botanical drawing at an art school in Nottingham where she met Freddie Basford, a PhD chemistry student. They married in 1936. They later went on to live in Manchester and have 3 children.

After publishing her work on fuchsia breeding, she landed a job in the Botany Department at the University of Manchester, where she worked with geneticist S. C. Harland. She studied her M.S on the genetic and morphogenetic effects of radiation on groundsel plant material.

Basford travelled with Harland to Peru to work on breeding varieties of maize. Upon return to the UK, she took a position at the Department of Diagnostic Cytology at Christie Hospital, where she worked until her retirement.

== Work ==
=== Fuchsia Plant Breeding ===
In the late 1940s Basford began cultivating and hybridising species of fuchsia. She took evening classes on botany at Manchester University. In 1952, she wrote a paper for the Journal of the Fuchsia Society describing a hybrid fuchsia from a New Zealand fuchsia and a Mexico fuchsia, proving this form of flower existed 20–30 million years ago. This was used as evidence for continental drift and the continents had separated.

=== The Green Man ===
She is also known for her research into the cultural significance of the Green Man, a mythical figure who had a head that sprouted foliage. In 1978, she published The Green Man, discussing how the figure was a motif for the "spiritual dimension of nature" in architecture, with an important relevance in modern society.

Basford's study of the Green Man continued late into her life. In 1991, she published a review in the journal Folklore responding to William Anderson's Green Man: The Archetype of Our Oneness with Nature. In the review, she discusses the fluidity of symbolic interpretation and the importance of personal background in iconographic study.
