= Isaac Anderson-Henry =

Scottish lawyer and horticulturist

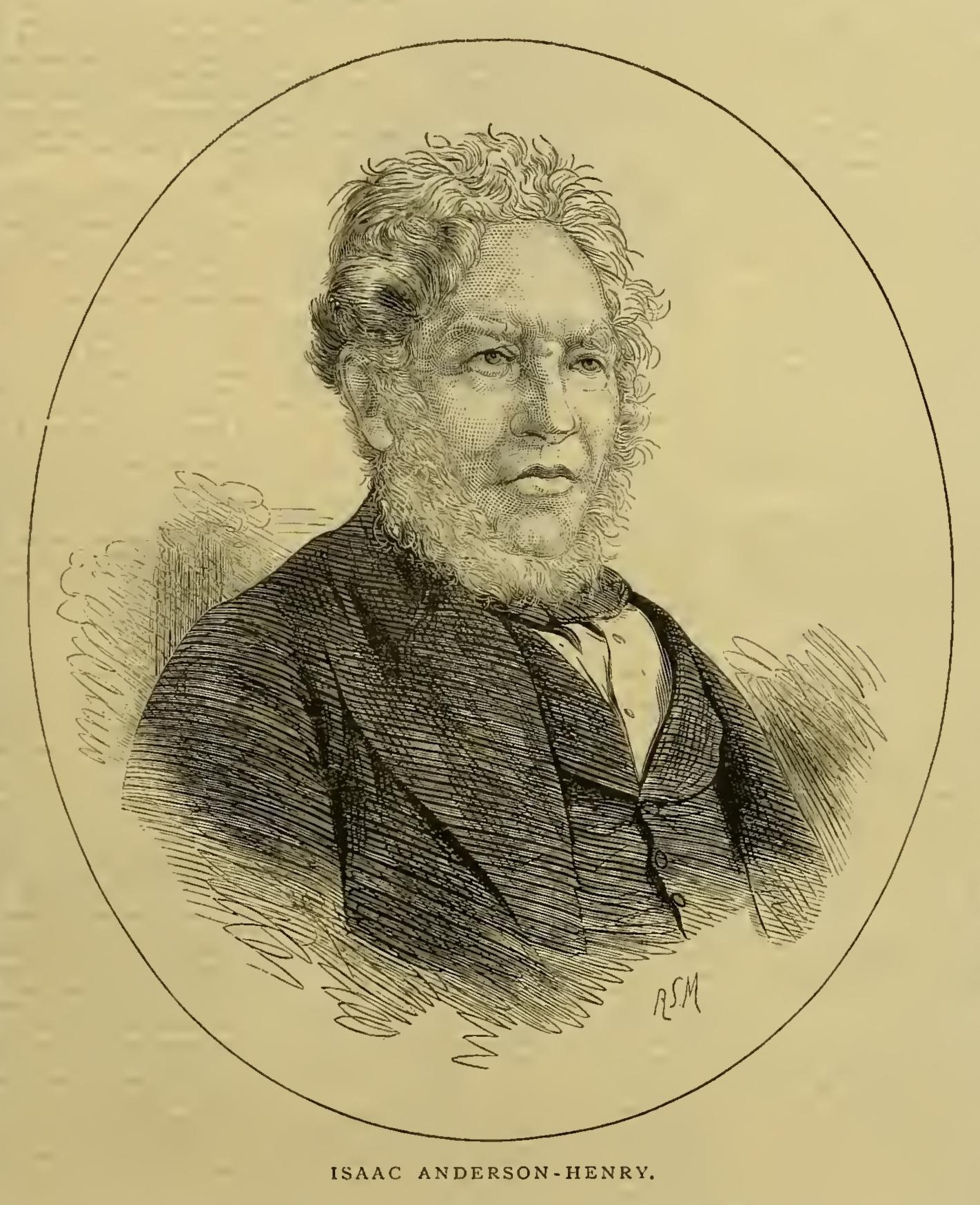
- Born: Isaac Anderson; 1800; Edinburgh(?)
- Died: 21 September 1884 (aged 83–84); Edinburgh(?)
- Occupations: lawyer, horticulturist
- Awards: Fellow, Royal Society of Edinburgh

Isaac Anderson-Henry of (born Anderson, 1800 – 21 September 1884) was a Scottish lawyer and horticulturist. A friend of Darwin, he was keenly interest in plant hybrids.

== Life ==
Anderson was baptized at Caputh on 14th July 1800. He studied law and began to practice in Edinburgh, he is shown as Isaac Anderson SSC in 1840, living at 14 Maryfield, and having offices nearby at 4 Montgomery Street. He added the name Henry later.

He retired from law practice in 1861 upon his wife's inheritance of estates in Woodend, Perthshire, when he changed his name to Anderson-Henry, enabling him to pursue horticulture. He was president of the Botanical Society of Edinburgh (1866-7), and collected plants from right around the world, including the Andes, north-western Himalayas, and New Zealand. He studied plant hybridisation before the rediscovery of genetics, and was a sometime correspondent of Charles Darwin. He noted the need for air by plant roots.

In 1869 he was elected a Fellow of the Royal Society of Edinburgh his proposer being John Hutton Balfour.

In his final years he lived at Hay Lodge in Trinity, Edinburgh.
