= Robert Alexander Robertson =

Scottish botanist

Robert Alexander Robertson FLS FRSE (1873–22 January 1935) was a Scottish botanist. He was president of the Edinburgh Botanical Society from 1915 to 1917.

== Life ==
He was born in Rattray in Perthshire in 1873 and educated locally before going to the University of Edinburgh to study botany, and graduating with an MA BSc in 1889.

He joined the staff of the University of St Andrews lecturing in practical zoology. He was promoted to Professor of Botany in 1929. In World War I he was in charge of the Officer Training Corps (OTC) at the University, with the rank of captain.

In 1902 he was elected a fellow of the Royal Society of Edinburgh. His proposers were David Fraser Harris, Sir Peter Redford Scott Lang, William Carmichael McIntosh, and Edward Albert Sharpey-Schafer. He was elected a fellow of the Linnean Society in 1903. He was president of the Botanical Society of Edinburgh in 1915–17.

He retired in the summer of 1934 and died on 22 January 1935.
