= Andrew Balfour =

Scotland international rugby union player

Sir Andrew Balfour
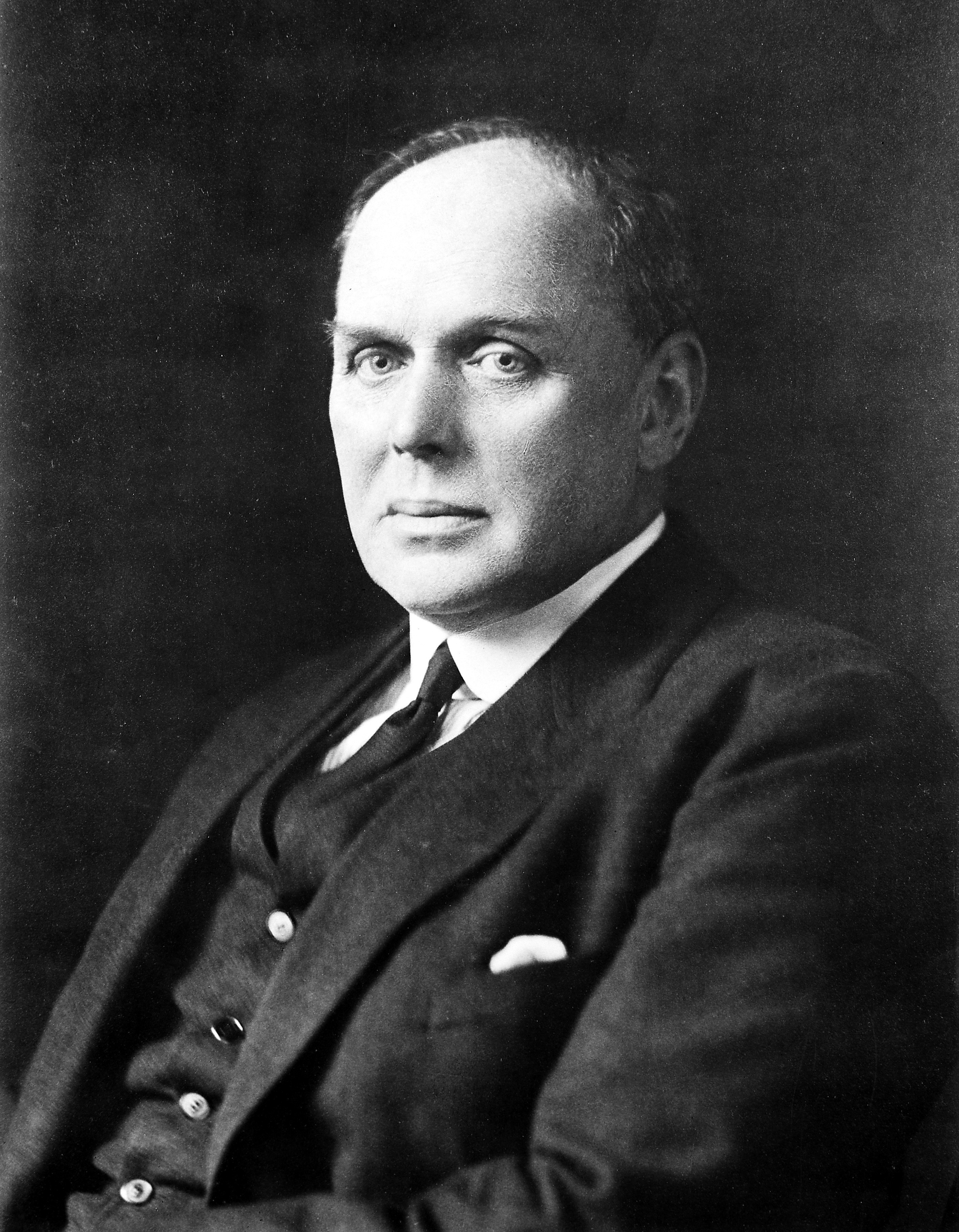
- Born: Andrew Balfour; 21 March 1873 Edinburgh, Scotland
- Died: 30 January 1931 (aged 57) Penshurst, England
- School: George Watson's College
- University: Edinburgh University; Caius, Cambridge
- Occupation: Medical officer

Rugby union career
- Position: Forward
Amateur team(s)
Years	Team	Apps	(Points)
- Cambridge University
–	Watsonians		
Provincial / State sides
Years	Team	Apps	(Points)
- Edinburgh District
International career
Years	Team	Apps	(Points)
1896–1897	Scotland	4	(0)

51st President of the Scottish Rugby Union
- In office 1930–1931
- Preceded by: Augustus Grant-Asher
- Succeeded by: John Sturrock

Sir Andrew Balfour KCMG CB (21 March 1873 – 30 January 1931) was a Scottish Medical Officer who specialised in tropical medicine. Balfour spent twelve years in Khartoum, Sudan and was the Medical Officer of Health in the city. As well as writing medical publications, Balfour also wrote historical fiction and fantasy novels, the majority of which were published from 1897 to 1903. In his youth Balfour was also a notable sportsman playing rugby union for Cambridge University in the Varsity Match and was selected to represent the Scotland national team.

== Medical career ==
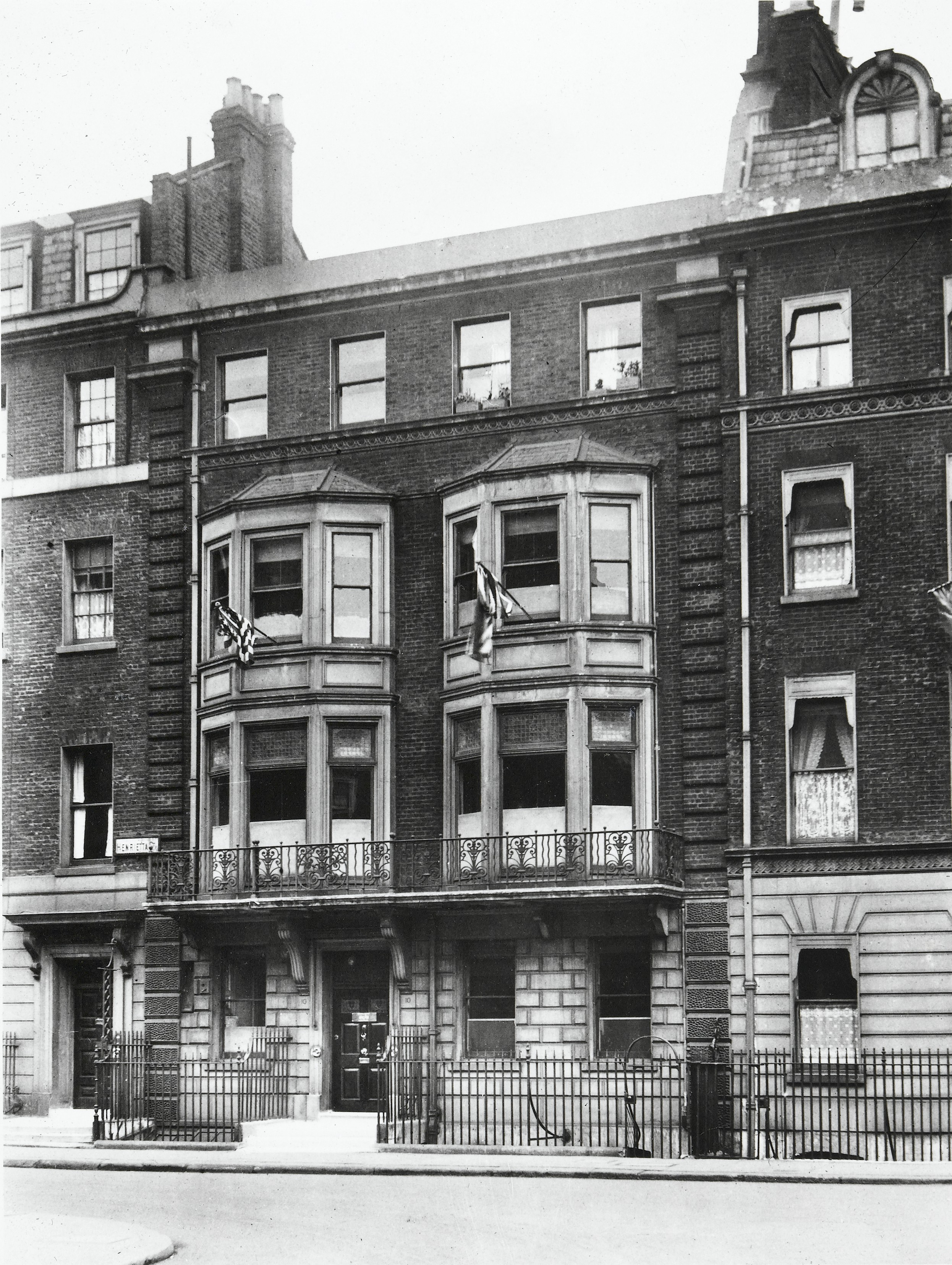
10 Henrietta Street, first home of the Wellcome Bureau of Scientific Research.

Balfour was born in Edinburgh on 21 March 1873 to Thomas Alexander Goldie Balfour. Balfour was educated at George Watson's College before matriculating to Edinburgh University.

He graduated from Edinburgh with a MB, CM degree in 1894 and joined his father's medical practice. Within two years of leaving Edinburgh University, Balfour returned to education when he entered Gonville and Caius College, Cambridge, as an advanced student. Balfour spent his time in Cambridge specialising in the prevention of disease, the field in which he would concentrate the rest of his medical career. He studied under Kanthack, performing research work on typhoid fever, and later spent a period of study at Strasbourg, before taking the D.PH. at Cambridge in 1897.

He completed his MD in Edinburgh in 1898; his thesis on the toxicity of dyestuffs in relation to river pollution winning him the student gold medal. He returned to the university to earn a BSc in Public Health in 1900.

In April 1900, Balfour travelled to South Africa to serve as a civil surgeon in the Second Boer War. He was posted to Estcourt as part of No. 7 General Hospital and later given duty at the pestilential typhoid camp in Pretoria. Later in the campaign he was put in charge of the British Garrison and Boer Laagers at Kaapsehoop. While in South Africa, Balfour contracted typhoid and returned to England before the end of 1901. During his time in South Africa, he came under the influence of the prominent Scottish parasitologist Patrick Manson, and from this period he became an ardent student of tropical medicine.

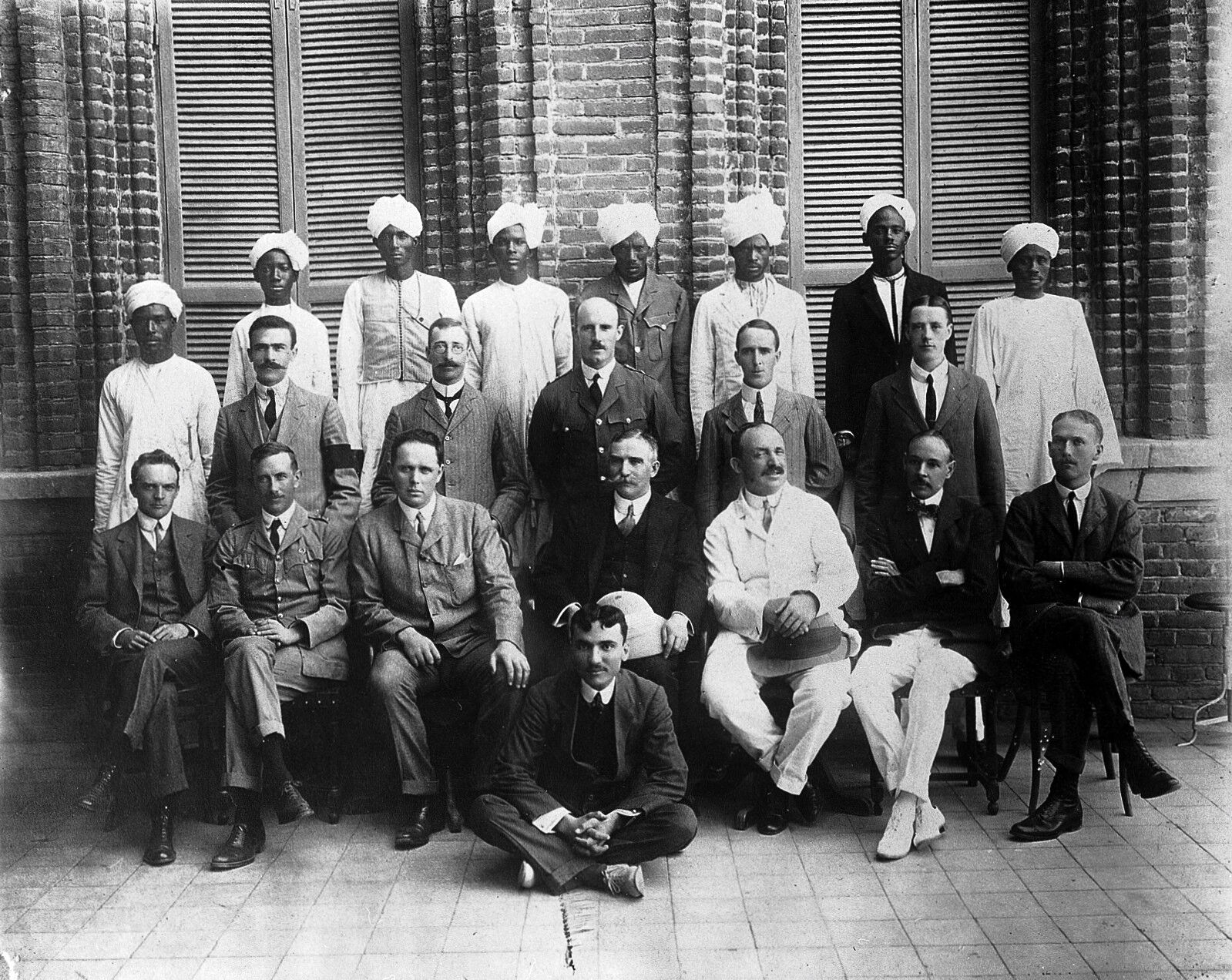
Wellcome Tropical Research Laboratory, Khartoum. Henry Wellcome is sat centrally with white pith helmet on lap; Balfour is to his right.

Balfour married in September 1902 to Grace, daughter of G. Nutter of Sidcup, and the same year he was made the director of the Wellcome Tropical Research Laboratory in Khartoum in Sudan where he also took up the post of Medical Officer of Health. Within two years he was appointed sanitary advisor to the Sudanese government. His new role within Sudan allowed Balfour to move in high-profile social circles, bringing him into contact with the likes of Lord Cromer, Lord Kitchener and Sir Reginald Wingate. During his time in Khartoum, he reduced deaths by malaria by 90 per cent through the removal of mosquito breeding grounds and improving the city's clean water systems and sanitation. In 1907 the Khedive awarded him the Fourth Class of the Imperial Ottoman Order of Osmanieh. The same period also saw Balfour contribute to four reports produced by the Wellcome Laboratory and in 1911 he co-wrote with Major R.G. Archibald a review of the advances in tropical medicine, which anticipated the work of the Tropical Disease Bureau which was set up in 1912.

His time in Africa also saw Balfour oversee the introduction of a floating laboratory, a gift from Dr Henry Wellcome to the Sudan Government. This allowed the department to conduct scientific work in the upper reaches of the Nile, and aided the understanding of diseases of the blood. Balfour's most notable work during this period was on spirochaetosis. He was appointed Companion of the Order of St Michael and St George in the 1912 King's Birthday Honours. After suffering from ill-health in Africa, he returned to Britain in 1913, to found the Wellcome Bureau of Scientific Research in London, and to organise what would later become the Wellcome Museum of Medical Science. 1913 also saw Balfour travel South America and the West Indies for research purposes.

With the outbreak of World War I, Balfour again joined the British war effort. Serving in the Royal Army Medical Corps, he reached the rank of Lieutenant-Colonel. Originally posted in France in 1914, he was later a member of the medical advisory committee in Mudros, Salonica and Egypt. After returning to England he was given the role of scientific adviser to the Inspector Surgeon General of the British forces in East Africa. During the war he was appointed Companion of the Order of the Bath in the 1918 New Year Honours, and was Mentioned in Despatches on 12 February 1918. He relinquished his commission on 31 May 1919. In 1920 he was awarded the Mary Kingsley award by the Liverpool School of Tropical Medicine.

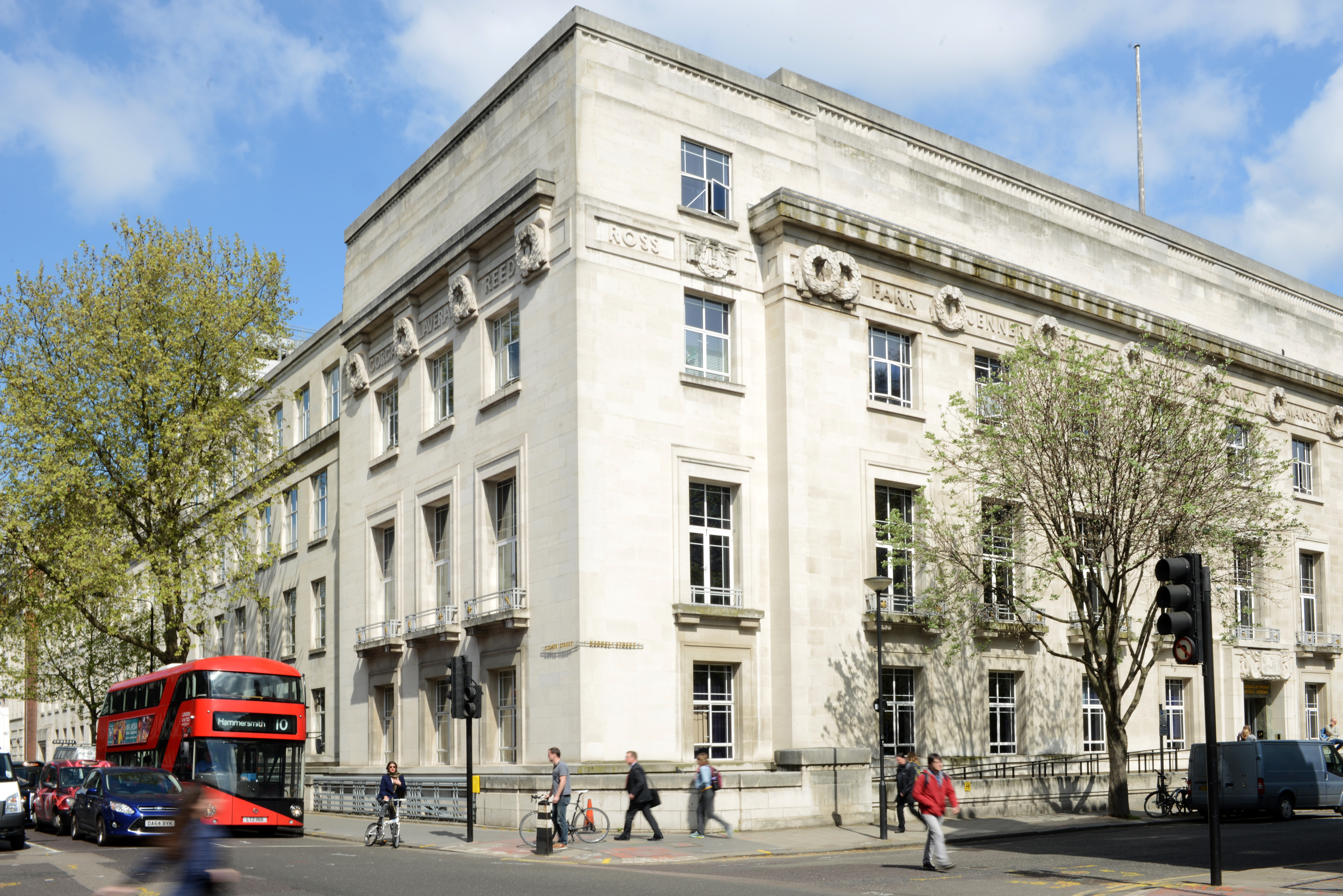
London School of Hygiene & Tropical Medicine, Keppel Street

In 1923 Balfour was appointed Director of the London School of Hygiene & Tropical Medicine, and oversaw the construction of a new school. He also served as president of the Royal Society of Tropical Medicine and Hygiene in 1925–1927. His papers are available from the archives at the London School of Hygiene & Tropical Medicine.

In 1929 he suffered from a nervous breakdown, believed to have been caused by the pressures of his new post; and although the British Medical Journal reported he fully recovered; other sources state his breakdown was complete. In the 1930 New Year Honours he was promoted KCMG, thus becoming Sir Andrew Balfour; but was later admitted to Cassel Hospital in Penshurst, Kent to be treated for clinical depression.

His uncle was John Hutton Balfour botanist and 7th Regius Keeper of the Royal Botanic Garden Edinburgh and Her Majesty's Botanist.

== Rugby Union career ==
=== Amateur career ===
Balfour was a keen sportsman, and as a youth was an amateur boxer and notable rugby player. His first came to note as a rugby player when he represented Watsonians, a club for former pupils of George Watson's College.

=== Provincial career ===
He was capped by Edinburgh District in 1898.

=== International career ===
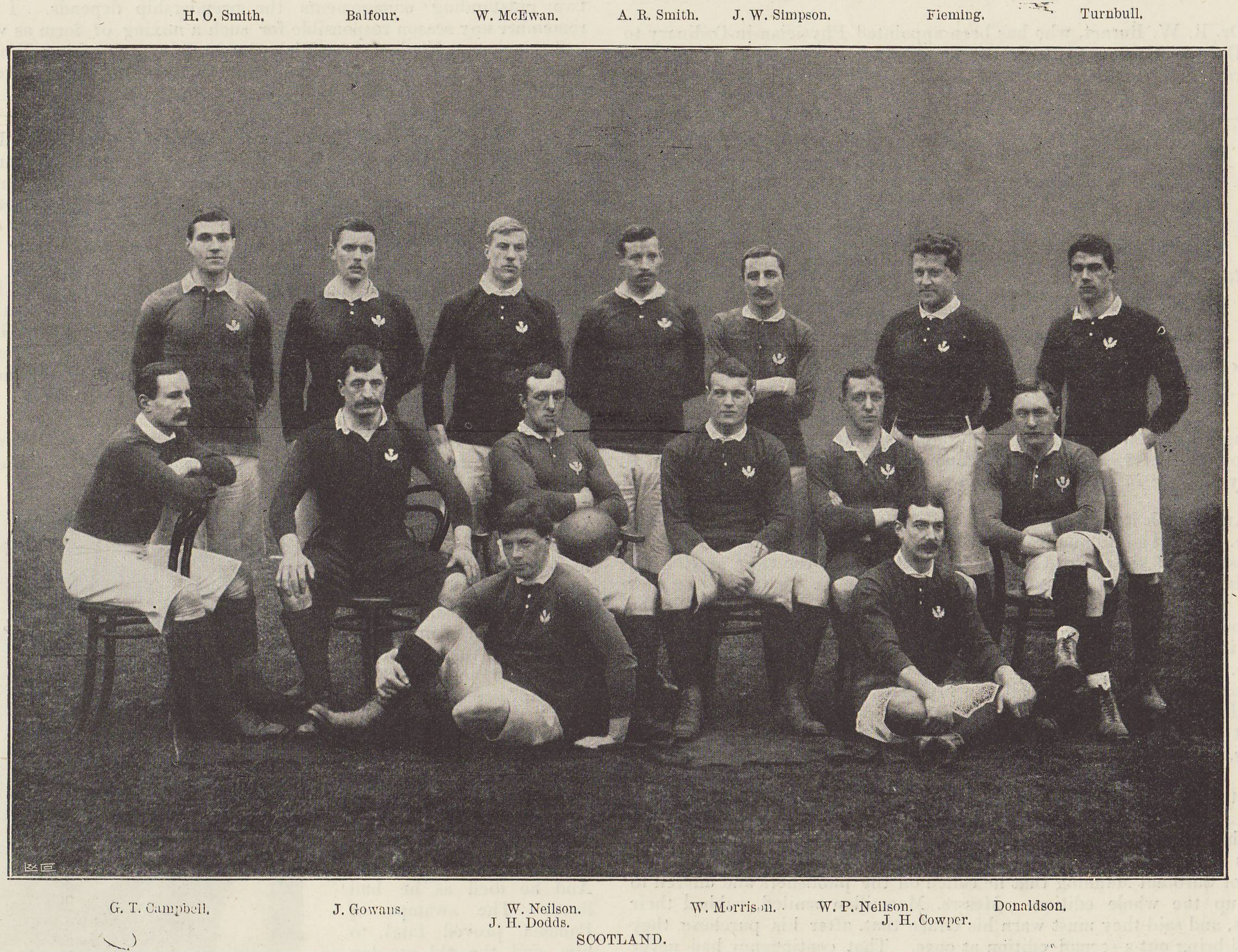
Balfour, back row second from left, with the 1896 Scotland team

It was while representing Watsonians that he was selected to play for the Scotland national team, in the opening game of the 1896 Home Nations Championship against Wales. At the age of 22, he was placed into his favoured position in the pack, in a Scottish team that contained two fellow Watsonians, Harry Smith and Robin Welsh. Wales won the game by two tries to nil. Despite the loss, Balfour would play in the remaining two games of the tournament, a scoreless draw away against Ireland and then an impressive win over England, which gave Scotland the Calcutta Cup for the fourth successive year. The following season (1896/97), Balfour had enrolled at Cambridge and won a place in the Cambridge University team. He played in the first of two Varsity Matches at the end of 1896 winning his first sporting 'Blue' in a victory over Oxford University.

Just a month later, the 1897 Home Nations Championship was underway, but Balfour was not selected for the national team, and would not rejoin the team until the final match of the competition, an away encounter with England. Scotland lost the game and Balfour never represented the team again. Balfour was still in favour with Cambridge, and was part of the University team to win the Varsity Match in 1897.

=== Administrative career ===
After his playing career came to an end, Balfour continued his association with rugby union as a supporter of London Scottish F.C., and became a national selector for the Scottish Rugby Union. During the 1929/30 season, Balfour was made Vice-President of the Scottish Rugby Union, the President being Sir Augustus Asher. The next season Balfour took on the role of President of the SRU, but did not complete the term due to his untimely death.

== Literary career ==
Outside the medical profession, for which he wrote several papers and publications, Balfour was also a keen writer of adventure novels. In 1897, while still at Cambridge University, he completed and saw published, his first novel By Stroke of Sword. Balfour's novels were mainly historical adventures, often set in Scotland and many having connections with his own medical background. Balfour wrote three historical novels. By Stroke of Sword is about Mary, Queen of Scots. To Arms! is about the Jacobite rising of 1715. Vengeance Is Mine is about Napoleon during the Hundred Days period. His final novel, The Golden Kingdom (1903) stands out as a lost race novel, described by The Encyclopedia of Science Fiction as being "under the influence of H. Rider Haggard and Robert Louis Stevenson".

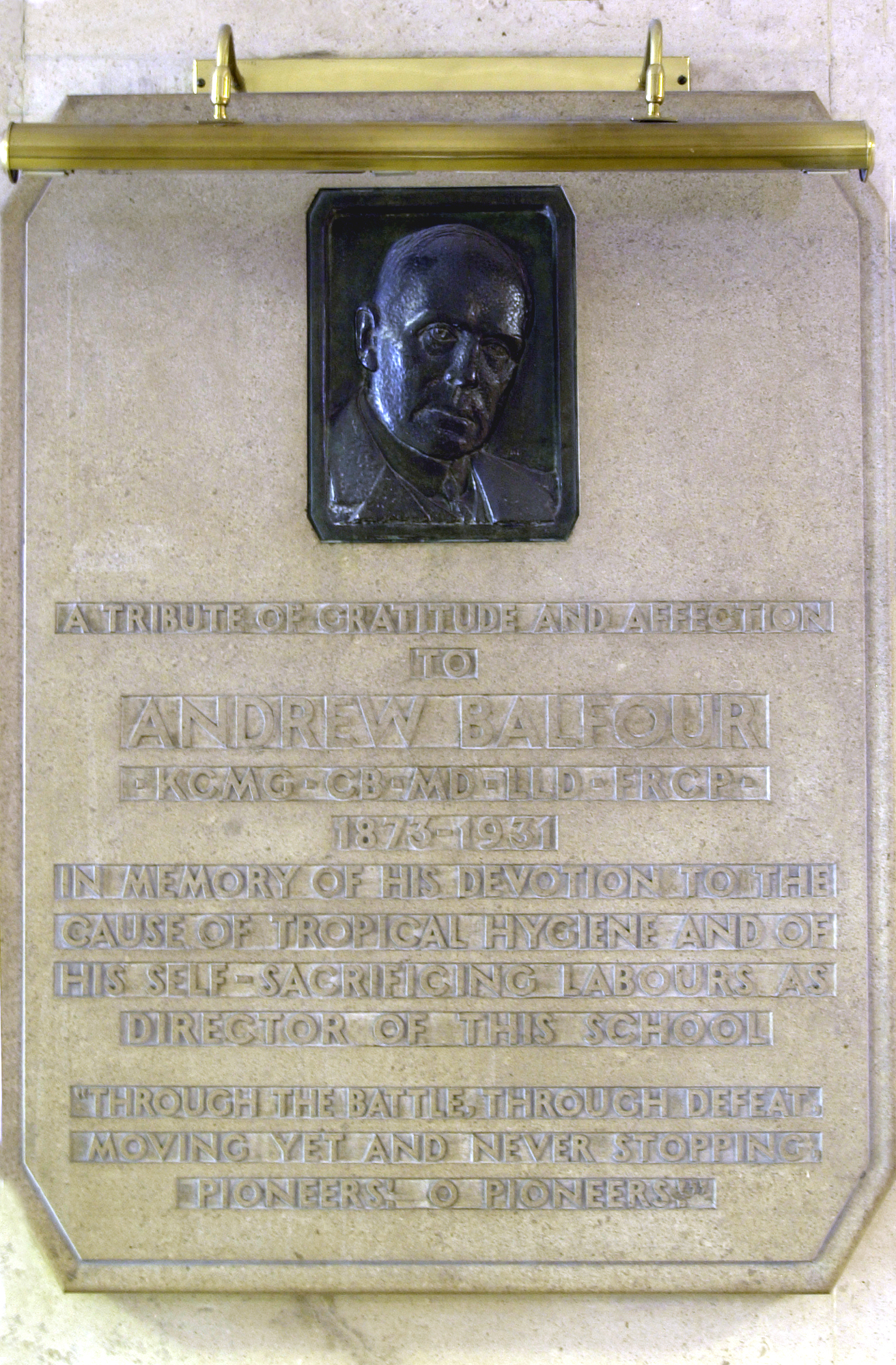
Plaque to commemorate Sir Andrew Balfour at the London School of Hygiene & Tropical Medicine

=== Written works ===
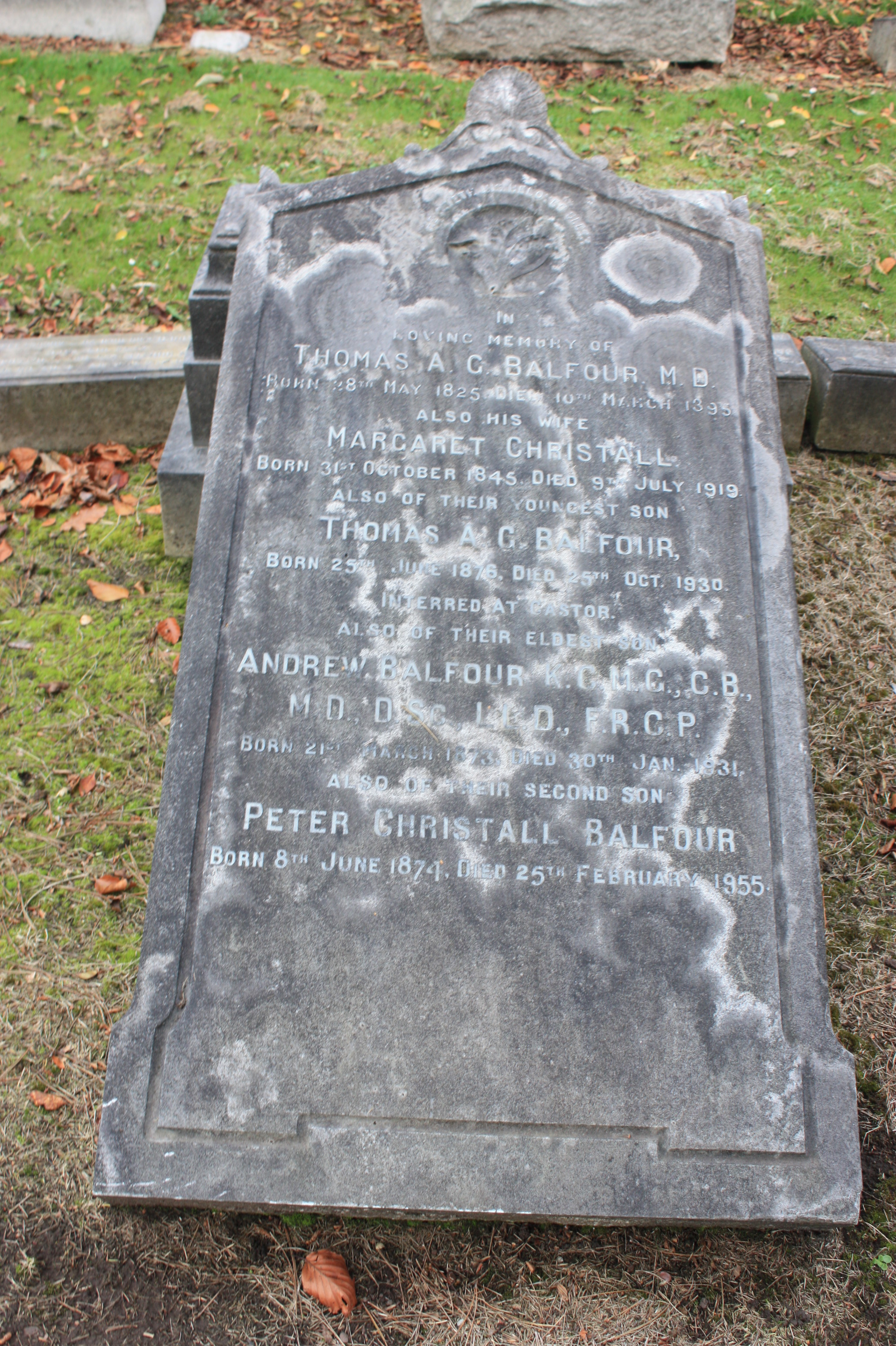
The grave of Andrew Balfour, Grange Cemetery, Edinburgh

Medical

- Medicine, Public Health and Preventive Medicine (with C. J. Lewis, 1902)
- Memoranda on Medical Diseases in Tropical and Sub-Tropical Areas (1916)
- War Against Tropical Disease (1920)
- Reports to the Health Committee of the League of Nations on Tuberculosis and Sleeping Sickness in Equatorial Africa (1923)
- Health Problems of the Empire (with H. H. Scott, 1924)

Novels

- By Stroke of Sword (1897)
- To Arms! (1898) Available at OpenLibrary
- Vengeance is Mine (1899) Available at OpenLibrary
- Cashiered and Other War Stories (1902)
- The Golden Kingdom (1903) Available at OpenLibrary

== Death ==
Balfour died in 1931 during his residence at Cassel Hospital. His frozen body was found on 30 January in the grounds of the hospital after he had fallen from a window. He was survived by his wife and two sons.

He is buried in Edinburgh with his parents in Grange Cemetery. The grave lies in the south-west section close to the central embankment containing the vaults. The headstone has fallen and is currently (2015) lying on its back.

== Family ==
His daughter Margaret married the Edinburgh physician James Duncan.

== Bibliography ==
- Marshall, Howard; Jordon, J.P. (1951). Oxford v Cambridge, The Story of the University Rugby Match. London: Clerke & Cockeran.
