= Scottish Crop Research Institute =

Scottish scientific institute

Coordinates: 56.4565°N 3.0694°W

The Scottish Crop Research Institute
- Type: Registered Charity
- Predecessor: Scottish Horticultural Research Institute; Scottish Plant Breeding Station
- Founded: 1987
- Defunct: March 31, 2011
- Fate: Merged
- Successor: The James Hutton Institute
- Headquarters: Dundee, Scotland
- Key people: Peter Gregory
- Subsidiaries: Mylnefield Research Services
- Website: www.scri.ac.uk

The Scottish Crop Research Institute more commonly known as SCRI was a scientific institute located in Invergowrie near Dundee, Scotland. As of April 2011, when SCRI merged with the Macaulay Land Use Institute to form The James Hutton Institute.

== History ==
The institute was opened in 1951 in Invergowrie under the name Scottish Horticultural Research Institute (SHRI). In 1981, the SHRI merged with the Scottish Plant Breeding Station (SPBS), which at the time was located near Edinburgh. Operations of the SPBS moved to the institute's site at Invergowrie and became the Scottish Crop Research Institute. In 1987 the institute accepted managerial responsibility for Biomathematics & Statistics Scotland, formerly the Scottish Agricultural Statistics Service. The commercial arm of the SCRI, Mylnefield Research Services, was launched in 1989. In April 2011 SCRI merged with the Macaulay Land Use Institute to form a new body, The James Hutton Institute.

== Research ==
The SCRI has both staff and PhD students who do research into several different aspects of plant science. Research facilities include laboratories, office space, glasshouses, growth chambers and 172 hectares of land which is used for field work. Research at SCRI is organised into four programmes: environment plant interactions, plant pathology, genetics and plant products and food quality. The institute carries out research funded by the Scottish Government's "Programme 1" for profitable and sustainable agriculture and the co-ordinator of Programme 1 is staff member Professor Howard Davies. The institute is also undertaking research into how climate change in Scotland will affect crop production, as the institute is involved with the Scottish Government's Agriculture and Climate Change Stakeholder Group.
