= Bathgate Academy =

Mixed secondary school in Bathgate, West Lothian, Scotland

Location
- Edinburgh Road; Bathgate, West Lothian, EH48 1LF; Scotland
- Coordinates: 55.8974°N 3.6133°W

Information
- Type: Secondary school
- Motto: Latin: Honos Habet Onus
- Established: 1833
- Founder: John Newland
- Local authority: West Lothian Council
- Gender: Mixed
- Age range: 11–18
- Enrolment: 1100 (2025)
- Houses: Forth; Nevis; Lomond
- Colours: Red, blue, yellow
- Website: www.bathgateacademy.westlothian.org.uk

Bathgate Academy is a mixed secondary school in Bathgate, West Lothian, Scotland, also serving the nearby town of Blackburn.

== History ==
Established by the will of John Newland (a Jamaican-plantation slave owner) in 1799, the school was originally located on Marjoribanks Street; its main building dates from 1833 and was designed by R & R Dickson. In 1965, the academy merged with Lindsay High School and moved fully to a new campus further east at Boghall two years later. The existing Lindsay High building on Kirk Road was taken over by the local Catholic school, St Mary's Academy, which already had its own buildings next door – all were demolished in 1994. From 1970 to 1988, the rector (headteacher) was Ian McGregor.

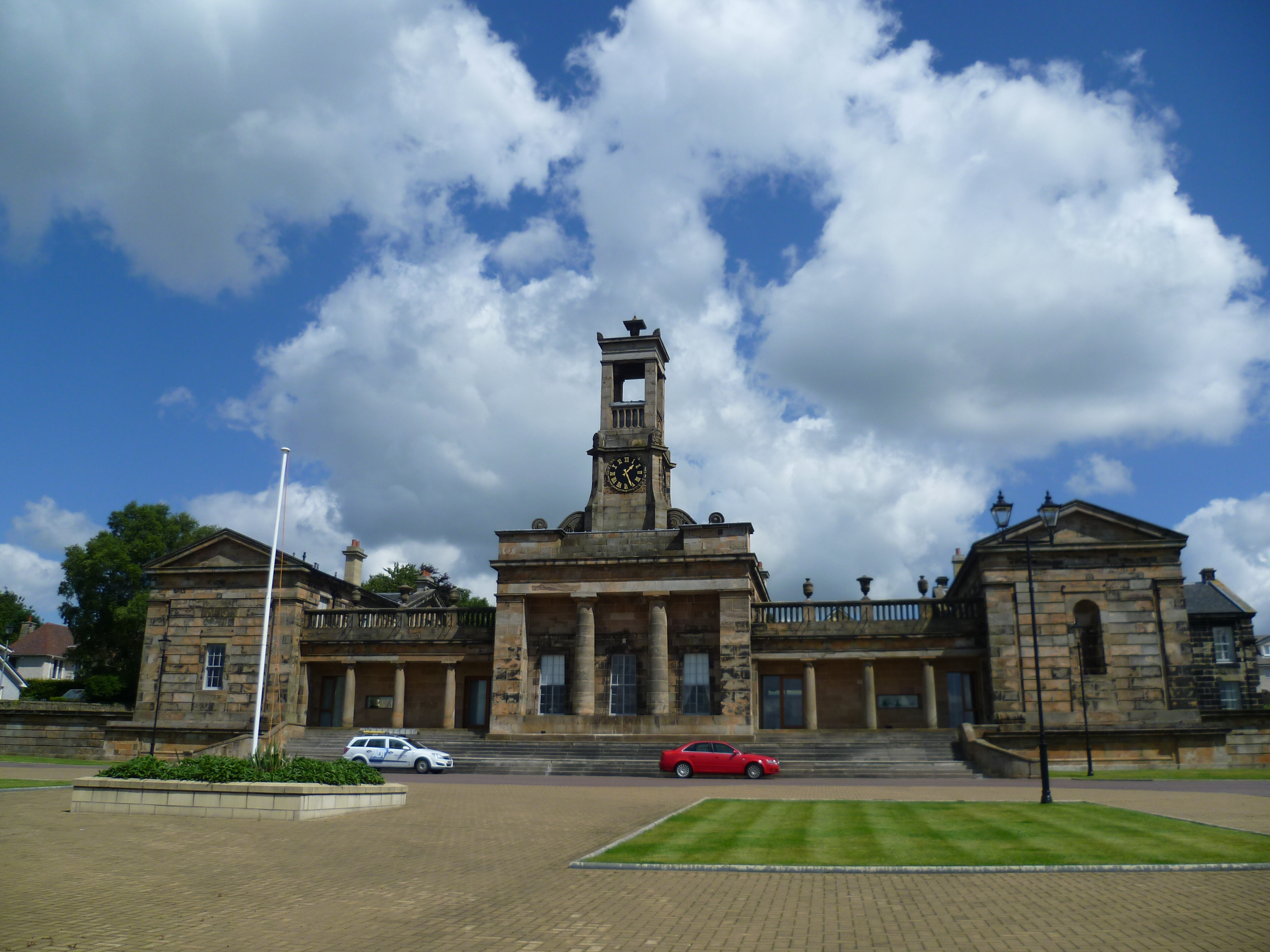
Old Bathgate Academy

The original Academy building was taken over by West Lothian College (originally Bathgate Technological College) in the 1960s when the secondary school moved to its current location – it was also used as annexe to Balbardie Primary School in the 1960s and 70s. After the college moved to new premises in Livingston, the old Academy lay unused for several years in the early 21st century before being converted to apartments, forming the centrepiece of a development. Now, The school has a roll of around 1200 pupils and 85 staff. The current headteacher is (Mrs.) Eileen Paxton.

== Notable former pupils ==
- John McIntyre, Professor of Divinity and Principal of New College in the University of Edinburgh, Moderator of the General Assembly of the Church of Scotland, Dean of the Thistle
- Paul di Resta, Formula 1 racing driver and television presenter
- Richard B. Angus of Montreal, co-founder of the Canadian Pacific Railway and President of the Bank of Montreal
- Lieutenant-General Sir James Baird, senior British Army officer and Director General Army Medical Services
- Sir Andrew Stark, British ambassador to Denmark
- Jack Kane, Lord Provost of Edinburgh
- Robert Lyell Mitchell, chemist
- Marcus Fleming, economist
- Very Rev Alison Elliot, first female Moderator of the General Assembly of the Church of Scotland
- William Wolfe, Leader of the SNP
