= Thomas A. G. Balfour =

19th-century Scottish physician

Thomas Alexander Goldie Balfour FRCPE, FRSE (28 May 1825 – 10 March 1895) was a Scottish physician and botanist. He was the father of Sir Andrew Balfour.

== Life ==
Balfour was born in Edinburgh to Andrew Balfour and Magdalene Goldie Balfour. He graduated at the University of Edinburgh, Medical School, in 1851 with the thesis 'Alcohol as an etiological agent'. He became a member of the Botanical Society of Edinburgh in 1868, and served as President of the society from 1877–1879, subsequently continuing as a Vice-President and Councillor. He became a Fellow of the Royal Society of Edinburgh in 1870. He died in Edinburgh in 1895.

== Works ==
- The Typical Character Of Nature, Or, All Nature A Divine Symbol
