= Claude Wardlaw =

British botanist

Claude Wardlaw FRSE FLS
- Born: Claude Wilson Wardlaw; 4 February 1901
- Died: 16 December 1985 (aged 84)
- Education: Paisley Grammar School
- Alma mater: University of Glasgow; University of Manchester
- Scientific career
- Workplaces: McGill University
- Doctoral students: Elizabeth Cutter

Claude Wilson Wardlaw FRSE FLS (4 February 1901 – 16 December 1985) was a British botanist, who specialised in diseases of the banana.

== Early life and education ==
He was born in western central Scotland on 4 February 1901, the son of Major J. Wardlaw of the Highland Light Infantry. He was educated at Paisley Grammar School.

He studied Natural Sciences at University of Glasgow graduating BSc around 1920. He continued as a postgraduate gaining his doctorate PhD and then going to McGill University in Canada to gain a second doctorate DSc.

== Career and research ==
He then returned to Britain for final studies University of Manchester, gaining an MSc.

He began lecturing in botany at Glasgow University around 1927. In this year he was elected a Fellow of the Royal Society of Edinburgh. His proposers were Frederick Orpen Bower, James Montagu Frank Drummond, John Graham Kerr and William Wright Smith.

His professional specialism in bananas began in 1928, when he was appointed Plant Pathologist for Banana Research at the Imperial College of Tropical Agriculture in Trinidad. His focus was researching the Panama Disease that had affected plantations in the West Indies. His book Green Havoc (1935) describes his investigations. In the same year, he published another book, Diseases of the Banana, which was republished in an expanded edition as Banana Diseases in 1961 and 1972.

While in Trinidad, Wardlaw was also involved with the work of the Low Temperature Research Station, where he was appointed officer-in-chief in 1933, as well as researching various tropical fruits of the region.

In 1940, Wardlaw returned to Britain to serve as Professor of Cryptogamic Botany at the University of Manchester. He held this position until 1958, when he became the George Harrison Professor of Botany, and later Emeritus Professor of Botany in 1966. As Professor of Cryptogamic Botany he was elected to membership of the Manchester Literary and Philosophical Society in 1946.

=== Publications ===
- Green Havoc (1935)
- Diseases of the Banana (1935)
- Tropical Fruits and Vegetables: Storage and Transport (1937)
- Phylogeny and Morphogenesis (1952)
- Embryogenesis in Plants (1955)
- Banana Diseases (1961)
- Organisation and Evolution in Plants (1965)
- Morphogenesis in Plants: A Contemporary Study (1968)
- Essays on Form in Plants (1968)
- Cellular Differentiation in Plants, and Other Essays (1969)

== Personal life ==
In 1928 Wardlaw married Jessie Connell (d. 1971), with whom he had two sons.
