= Macaulay Institute =

Research institute based in Aberdeen, Scotland

Coordinates: 57°8′00″N 2°9′30″W

The Macaulay Land Use Research Institute
- Company type: Registered Charity
- Predecessor: Hill Farming Research Organisation (HFRO); Macaulay Institute for Soil Research (MISR)
- Founded: 1987
- Defunct: 31 March 2011
- Fate: Merged
- Successor: The James Hutton Institute
- Headquarters: Aberdeen, Scotland
- Key people: Richard Aspinall
- Subsidiaries: Macaulay Scientific Consulting Ltd.
- Website: macaulay.webarchive.hutton.ac.uk

The Macaulay Institute, formally the Macaulay Land Use Research Institute and sometimes referred to simply as The Macaulay, was a research institute based at Aberdeen in Scotland, which is now part of the James Hutton Institute. Its work covered aspects such as landscape, soil and water conservation and climate change.

== History ==
The Macaulay Institute for Soil Research was founded in 1930. A benefaction of £10,000 from one of Canada's Scottish sons, Thomas Bassett Macaulay, of the Sun Life Assurance Company of Canada was used to purchase 50 acres and buildings at Craigiebuckler in Aberdeen. Macaulay's aim was to improve the productivity of Scottish agriculture. Thomas Bassett Macaulay was a descendant of Macaulay family of Lewis, who were centred on the Hebridean Isle of Lewis. He was true to his Hebridean roots throughout his life, often giving large donations to Lewis, which funded various projects including a new library and a new wing at Lewis hospital.

The new Macaulay Institute opened on a site near Bucksburn in April 1987. It was formed by the merger of the Macaulay Institute for Soil Research and the Hill Farm Research Organisation. The proposed merger was announced in December 1985 with the government anticipating that it would result in cost savings. It was established to carry out research in support of the agricultural industry, taking account of the interaction between the industry and other land users, and set in the context of the environmental objectives of the UK Government and the European Union.

In April 2011, the Macaulay Institute merged with SCRI (Scottish Crop Research Institute) in Dundee to form the James Hutton Institute. The chief executive of the new institute is Professor Iain Gordon.

== Research ==
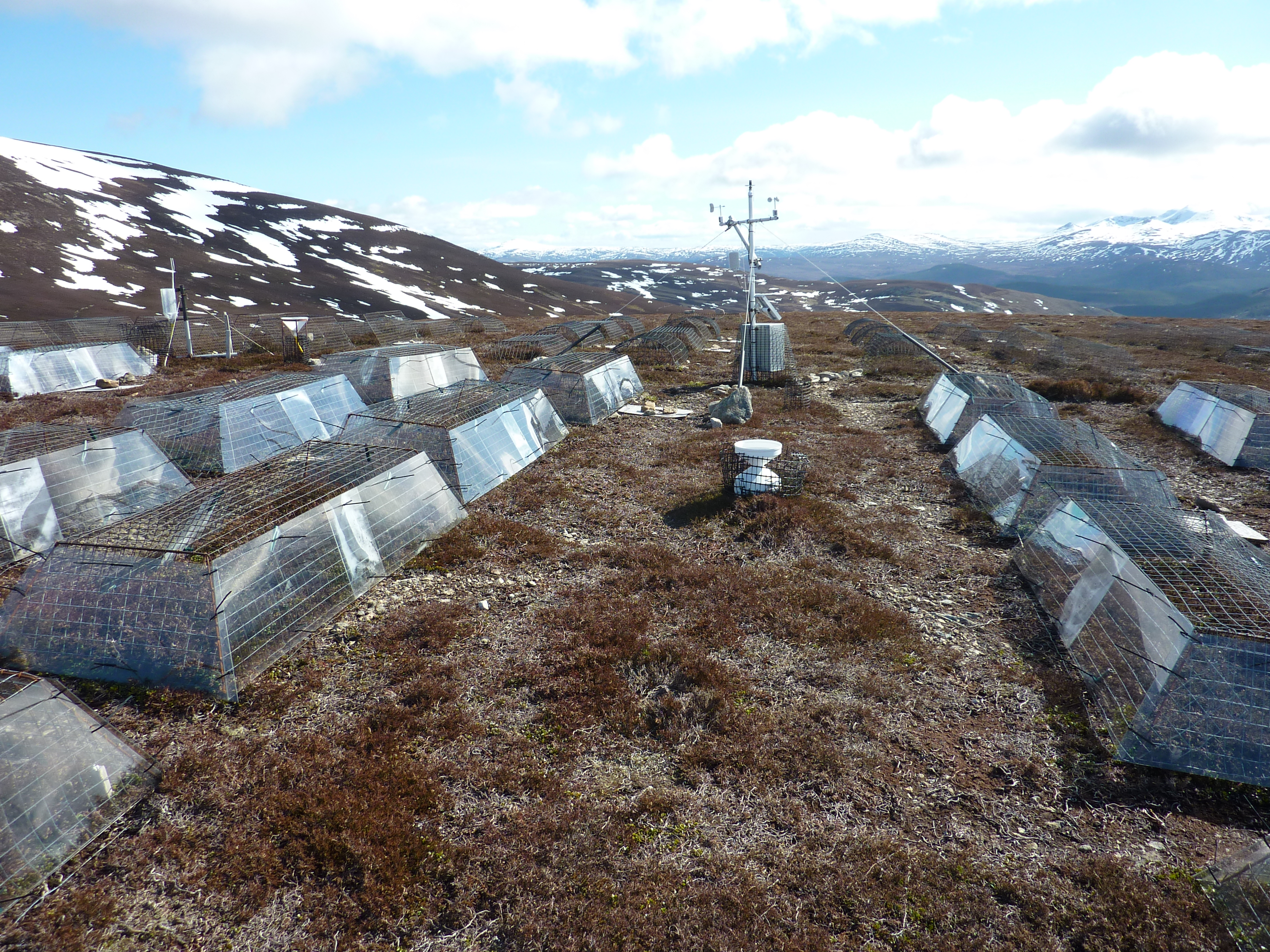
A climate change experiment run by the Macaulay Institute at Culardoch

It is an international centre for research and consultancy on the environmental and social consequences of rural land uses. Interdisciplinary research across the environmental and social sciences aims to support the protection of natural resources, the creation of integrated land use systems, and the development of sustainable rural communities.

With an annual income from research and consultancy of over £11million, the Macaulay Institute is the largest interdisciplinary research organisation of its kind in Europe.

It is one of the main research providers to the Scottish Government and currently about 75% of the Macaulay's income is related to commissioned research programmes, principally on "Land Use and Rural Stewardship". The 300 staff and postgraduate students are drawn from over 25 countries, and conduct research in Scotland, across Europe and internationally, with a wide range of partner organisations. Their goal is that the research they undertake provides evidence that will help shape future environmental and rural-development policy both in Scotland and internationally.

The Macaulay Land Use Research Institute was a registered charity since 1931. Commercial services are delivered through Macaulay Scientific Consulting Ltd, its subsidiary consultancy company.

The mineral Macaulayite is named after the institute.

== Notable Directors ==
- William Ogg Gammie FRSE LLB (1930–1943)
- Donald McArthur FRSE (1948–1958)
- Robert Lyell Mitchell FRSE (1968–1975)
- Thomas Summers West CBE, FRS, FRSE (1975–1987)

== Head of Microbiology ==
- Donald Webley FRSE (1945–1975)

== Affiliations ==
The Macaulay Institute is a member of the Aberdeen Research Consortium which also includes:

- University of Aberdeen
- FRS Marine Laboratory, Aberdeen
- Rowett Research Institute
- Robert Gordon University
- Scottish Agricultural College

== Current work ==
LADSS and AGRIGRID are examples of projects that are being undertaken at the institute.

== See also ==
- AGRIGRID
- LADSS
