= James Alexander MacDonald (botanist) =

Botanist (1908–1997)

James Alexander Macdonald FRSE FIB BSE (17 June 1908 – 26 April 1997) was a 20th-century Scottish botanist and plant pathologist. Friends and family called him Jay Macdonald.

== Life ==
He was born in Dingwall on 17 June 1908, one of five children, to Eliza Kelman and James Alexander Macdonald FRSE (1867–1937), HM Chief Inspector of Schools for the Scottish Highlands and a former rector of Leith Academy. He was home educated by his mother at Kilmacolm then at Inverness Royal Academy. He then went to the University of Edinburgh to study agriculture but then decided to also study botany as a joint degree. He continued as a postgraduate in botany, gaining his doctorate (PhD) in 1935. On gaining his doctorate he began lecturing in botany at St Andrews University and was given his professorship in 1961. In the same year he became the joint founder and official keeper of St Andrews Botanic Garden.

In the Second World War he served as a flight lieutenant in the RAF in India and Malaya, mainly working in radar. In 1940 he was elected a fellow of the Royal Society of Edinburgh. His proposers were Robert James Douglas Graham, Sir William Wright Smith, Sir D'Arcy Wentworth Thompson and Alexander Nelson. He served as Vice President of the Society 1961–64.

He retired in 1977. Although sickly in his early life, he developed a love of active sports by his late teens, including rugby and hockey. By later life he had also developed a love of golf, and was ideally located in St Andrews for this pastime. He was also a keen angler.

He died in St Andrews on 26 April 1997.

== Family ==
In 1935 he married Constance Mary Simmie, second daughter of James Duff Simmie of Inverness. They had one daughter, Anne MacDonald (born 1940).

== Publications ==
- Introduction to Mycology (1951)
- Trees in St Andrews (1971)
- Plant Science and Scientists in St Andrews (1984)
