= F. W. Sansome =

British botanist (1902–1981)

Frederick Whalley Sansome CBE FRSE FLS (1902–1981) was a 20th-century British botanist who spent most of his later professional life teaching in Africa.

== Life ==
He was born in Edinburgh on 27 February 1902 the son of Alfred Woodrow Sansome, a draper in F S Sansome & Son at 32 Queensferry Street, and his wife Kate Elizabeth Whalley. The family lived at 21 Merchiston Crescent, a flat in the Bruntsfield district. By 1910 they had moved to a larger house, an end-terraced villa at 2 Cluny Place in the south of the city.

He was educated in Edinburgh then studied Botany at Edinburgh University graduating BSc then continuing as a postgraduate and gaining a doctorate (PhD). In 1923 he began work as an assistant at the Plant Breeding Station in Edinburgh under the directorship of J M F Drummond. from there he obtained a post as Assistant Lecturer in Botany at Glasgow University. He then became Senior Lecturer in Horticulture at Manchester University.

In 1930 he was elected a Fellow of the Royal Society of Edinburgh. His proposers were James Montagu Frank Drummond, William Wright Smith, James Robert Matthews, Sir John Graham Kerr and Samuel Williams.

In 1948 he left Britain for more novel employment, accepting a professorship at University College in Nigeria. In 1958 he transferred to the University of Ghana. Finally, from 1962 until retiral in 1967, he was at Ahmadu Bello University in Zaria. Although he was of retiral age, his decision to leave was further precipitated by the Biafran War.

He died in Norfolk on 26 March 1981.

== Family ==
In 1929 he married mycologist Eva Richardson FLS (1906-2001).

== Publications ==
- Natural Selection of Drosophila
- Botany in Nigeria
- Recent Advances in Plant Genetics (1934)
