= Donald McArthur =

Scottish chemist

Prof Donald Neil McArthur FRSE FRIC (1892-1965) was a 20th-century Scottish chemist who served as the director of the Macaulay Institute for Soil Science from 1948 to 1958.

== Life ==
He was born in Glasgow on 2 August 1892 the son of Donald McArthur, a coal trader and ship owner, and his wife Anne Dewar. The family lived at 15 Maxwell Drive in Glasgow. He was educated at Allan Glen's School then studied chemistry at Glasgow University graduating BSc in 1913.

He went to work at the West of Scotland College of Agriculture first as a Lecturer and was promoted to professor following his award of a doctorate in 1928. In 1945 he moved to the Macaulay Institute near Aberdeen, becoming its Director in 1948.

In 1929 he was elected a Fellow of the Royal Society of Edinburgh. His proposers were James Montagu F. Drummond, Alexander Lauder, Sir James Walker and George Barger.

In 1953 he was created a Commander of the Order of the British Empire.

He died in Edinburgh on 23 August 1965.

== Family ==
He married Anne Videon Brough.

== Publications ==
- A New Photographic Phenomenon (1919)
