= Elizabeth Cutter =

Scottish botanist and professor

Elizabeth Cutter FRSE
- Born: Elizabeth Graham Cutter; 9 August 1929; Edinburgh
- Died: 23 October 2010 (aged 81)
- Education: University of St Andrews (BSc); University of Manchester (PhD)
- Scientific career
- Workplaces: University of Manchester
- Thesis: Experimental and Analytical Studies on Shoot Morphogenesis (1954)
- Doctoral advisor: Claude Wardlaw

Elizabeth Graham Cutter (9 August 1929 – 23 October 2010) FRSE was a Scottish professor at the University of Manchester and oversaw its botany department merged with ten other departments and worked to ensure it would be established in the new school.

== Early life and education ==
Cutter was born on 9 August 1929 in Edinburgh. She was the only daughter of Roy and Alix Cutter. Her parents met in Sudan in 1928, where Roy had been working as a judge colonial civil service. Both remained there until 1936, and during that period, Cutter was cared for by three maiden aunts. She went to an all-girls boarding school, Rothesay House, where she became its head girl. Cutter, along with the other students, were evacuated to Paxton House near Coldstream during the Second World War, and were required to shelter in the school's basement when German warplanes flew overhead. She graduated from the University of St Andrews in 1951 with first class honours degree in botany. Cutter later studied a PhD at the University of Manchester from which she graduated in 1954.

== Career and research ==
Immediately after her graduation she was appointed assistant lecturer at Manchester where she served between 1955 and 1964. Cutter left the position after she was approached by the University of California, Davis to replace their plant anatomist Katherine Esau. Four years later, she was promoted to a full professorship role. Cutter's reputation was enhanced following the publication of a two-work publication on Plant Anatomy that was used as an undergraduate paper across the United Kingdom and North America. She resigned her position in 1972 in order to care for her mother in the United Kingdom, and was promoted to the position of a senior lectureship at the University of Manchester. Seven years later Cutter was promoted to the George Harrison Chair of Botany. She became aware that the department need to regain its past reputation although it would require a large amount of work in order for this to occur. However this had difficulty when the government of Margaret Thatcher reduced the amount of funding for universities which meant Cutter was unable to recruit new staff.

Botany and ten other departments in Science and Medicine merged to form Manchester's School of Biological Sciences in 1986. Cutter worked to ensure that Plant Sciences could establish itself as a secure position in the new School, despite raising concerns that the re-organisation would disadvantage the university's botany department, and became a loyal supporter to individuals who led the school. Cutter was the leader of a root and branch revision of the undergraduate curriculum which resulted in the foundation of 18 modular-based B.Sc. degrees in biological sciences. Although the school was established by the University's wish to improve research, Cutter had attracted an increase of student choice because of her leadership had ensured the benefits would be improved. She additionally held office in several societies including Fellow of the Royal Society of Edinburgh (FRSE), member of the Botanical Society of America, the Linnean Society of London, the International Society of Plant Morphologists and the Society for Experimental Biology.

=== Later life and legacy ===
Cutter had been regarded by many people as an excellent teacher and field botanist and led undergraduate field courses and she continued to participate in them in Manchester even after she became their Head of Department. She published over 50 papers and her research reputation attracted from graduate students from across the world. Cutter later retired from her position and settled in Gattonside where she pursued her lifelong hobbies of angling and photography. She also became president of the Botanical Society of Scotland, and gave four lectures across Scotland, and remained in contact with colleagues who ran field courses at Perthshire's Kindrogan Field Centre.

== Personal life ==
Cutter died on 23 October 2010 and had no living relatives.
