= Eva Sansome =

British mycologist (1906–2001)

Eva Sansome OBE
- Born: 9 September 1906
- Died: 11 February 2001 (aged 94)
- Spouse: F. W. Sansome

Academic background
- Education: Manchester University

Academic work
- Discipline: mycology
- Institutions: Manchester University; University of Ghana; Ahmadu Bello University

Eva Sansome, née Richardson (1906–2001) was a British mycologist.

== Life ==
Eva Richardson was born on 9 September 1906, possibly in New Zealand. She gained a DSc. from Manchester University, and in 1928 was appointed a fellow of the Linnean Society. In 1929 she married fellow botanist F. W. Sansome.

Sansome lectured in horticulture at the University of Manchester and the University of Ghana.

During the war she collaborated with Alexander Hollaender, Milislav Demerec and a young Esther M. Zimmer at the United States Public Health Service (Bethesda, Maryland), publishing in the very early field of x-ray- and UV-induced mutations. In the late 1950s she was registered at University College Ibadan, though on placement to Long Island Biological Laboratories. She researched meiosis in the oogonium. She studied the antheridium of Pythium debaryanum, showing in a 1963 paper that the mycelium of Pythium debaryanum was diploid, rather than (as previously believed) haploid. Subsequent work established that both oospores and mycelium are diploid in several Peronosporales genera.

A Reader in the Department of Botany at Ahmadu Bello University in the mid-1960s, she and her husband supported eliminating the Igbo from Northern Nigeria at the time of the 1966 anti-Igbo pogrom. She was awarded an OBE in the 1968 New Year Honours.

She collaborated with Clive Brasier. After her husband's death in 1981, Sansome moved to live with her son's family in Warwickshire. After a series of strokes, she died on 11 February 2001.

== Works ==
- Segmental interchange in Pisum sativum. Newcastle upon Tyne: University of Durham, 1941.
- 'Maintenance of heterozygosity in a homothallic species of the Neurospora tetrasperma type', Nature 157 (1946):484.
