= Natural Capital Initiative =

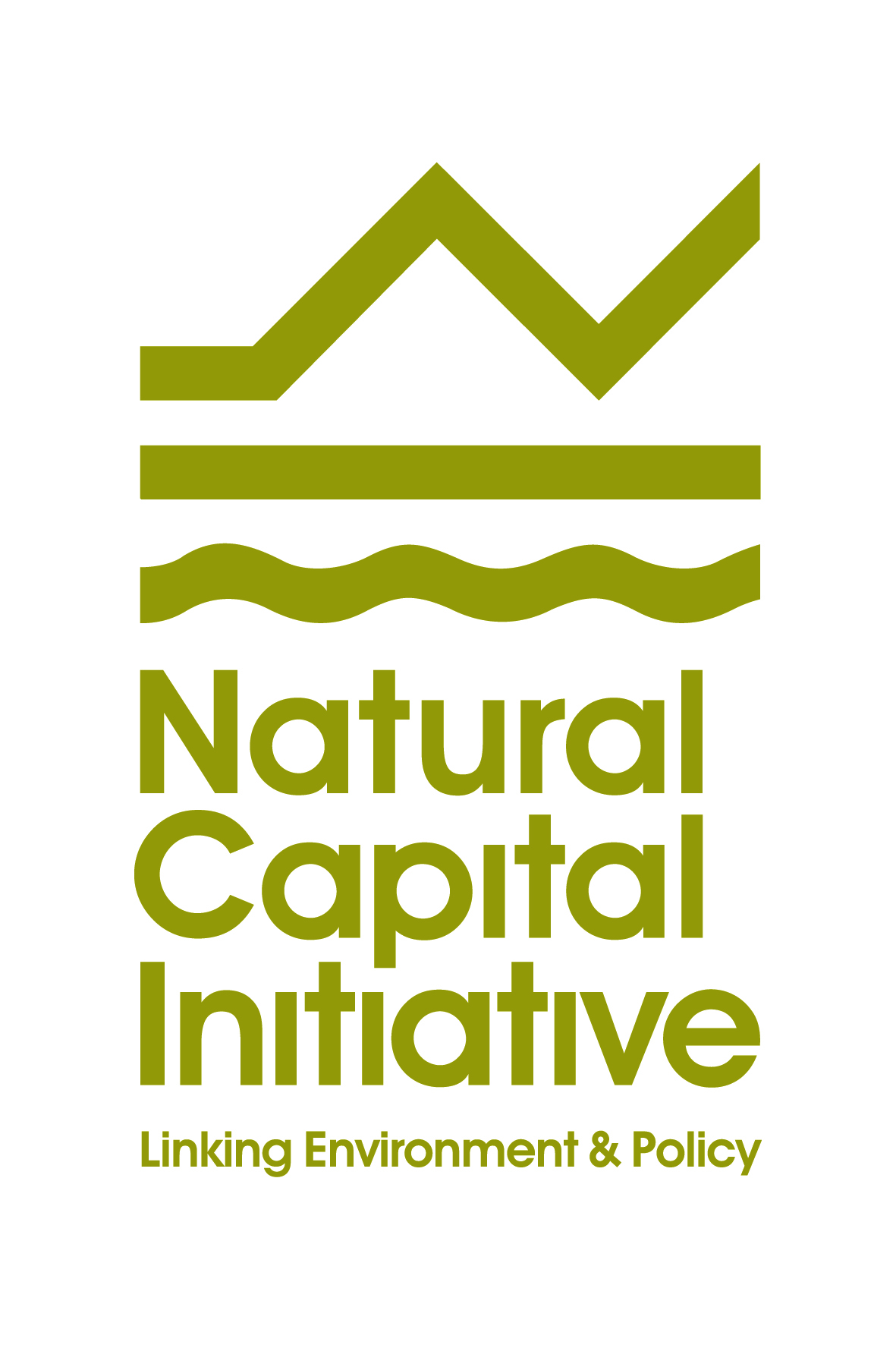

The Natural Capital Initiative (NCI) is a partnership of UK science organisations which promotes and supports decision-making across government, business and the private sector that results in the sustainable management of our natural capital. It is a partnership between three leading science organisations in the UK:

- UK Centre for Ecology and Hydrology
- Royal Society of Biology
- The James Hutton Institute.

== Mission ==
The Natural Capital Initiative is an influential convener of natural capital professionals, providing an independent platform for debate and joint working on natural capital challenges and solutions. Its vision is to grow a collaborative network that ensures sound natural capital science informs public policy and business decisions. NCI dialogues and publications make effective use of evidence to seek positive solutions that enhance natural capital for the benefit of people and nature.

== History ==
The Natural Capital Initiative was established in 2009 in response to the increasing global awareness of the need for more sustainable management of the world's limited natural resources, as highlighted by the 2005 Millennium Ecosystem Assessment. It was launched in April 2009 at a three-day symposium held in London, entitled Valuing our Life Support Systems.

Original partners included the Society of Biology, British Ecological Society and the Centre for Ecology & Hydrology. The James Hutton Institute joined the partnership in 2012.

Since 2009, the NCI has organised two more Valuing our Life Support Systems summits in 2014 and 2019 to push forward the shared natural capital agenda. In addition, it has organised over 20 dialogue sessions on natural capital management and protection.

== Influence ==
The Natural Capital Initiative events and publications have influenced UK policy directions and research agendas in many ways.

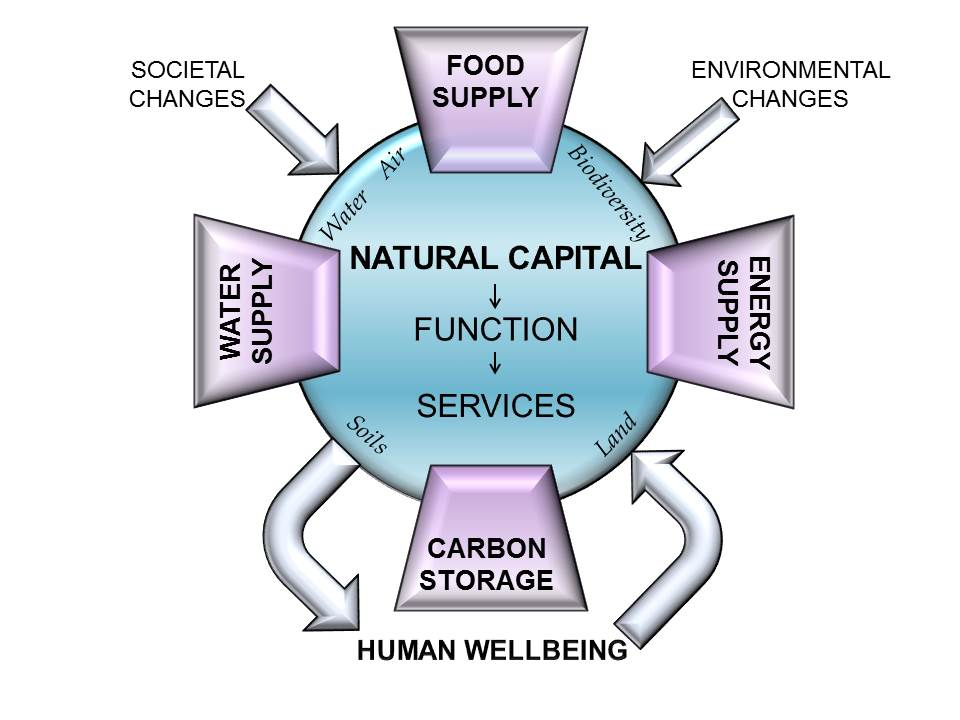
Natural Capital provides us with essential functions and ecosystem services.The NCI supports the UK government and policy-makers in putting natural capital at the heart of economic decision-making.

Recommendations from the 2009 symposium were included in the UK government own recommendations and resource documents to senior policy-makers. The Natural Capital Committee, supported by DEFRA, evolved out of the UK Government's 2011 Natural Environment White Paper, as did the 48 Local Nature Partnerships established across England which focus on sustainable land management, greening economic growth and human health and well-being.

In 2014 the NCI called on the UK government to introduce a natural capital accounting element into its national accounting framework, and supported the Natural Capital Committee's proposal for a 25-year Government plan for the UK Natural Environment, which has since been published.

The report from the Valuing our Life Support Systems 2014 was launched in June 2015 in a parliamentary event, chaired by Barry Gardiner MP. The report spelled out the need for a methodology to be established for valuing natural capital. It also raised concerns there was a danger that natural capital could be treated as a commodity unless an ethical framework was in place to ensure the process of natural capital valuation was applied fairly and evenly. It urged that all natural capital concepts needed to be clear, evidence-based and robust, and it welcomed the Government's proposal to extend the life of the Natural Capital Committee.

In 2019 the Defra chief scientific adviser Professor Sir Ian Boyd concluded that the summits have had an impact on government policy and the natural capital principle is now included in the 25-year environment plan and the environment bill. The summit report recommended a new way of working to engage more people. It highlighted the importance of nature for everyone's health and well-being and stressed the importance of the natural capital approach as a long-term investment across generations.

The summit has definitely had an impact on policy. What we’ve seen since the last summit is the 25-year environment plan being developed by government and an environment bill is currently in front of parliament. Both of those have taken up the natural capital principle.

— Prof. Sir Ian Boyd, Defra chief scientific adviser (2019)

== Publications ==
- Valuing Our Life Support Systems. Symposium Report. 2009
- Valuing our Life Support Systems 2014. Summary Report
- Defining and delivering resilient ecological networks: Nature conservation in England. Policy directions (2018)
- Wholescape Thinking Guidance Note. (Updated 2019)
- Valuing our Life Support Systems 2019. Summary Report
