= Arthur Milnes Marshall =

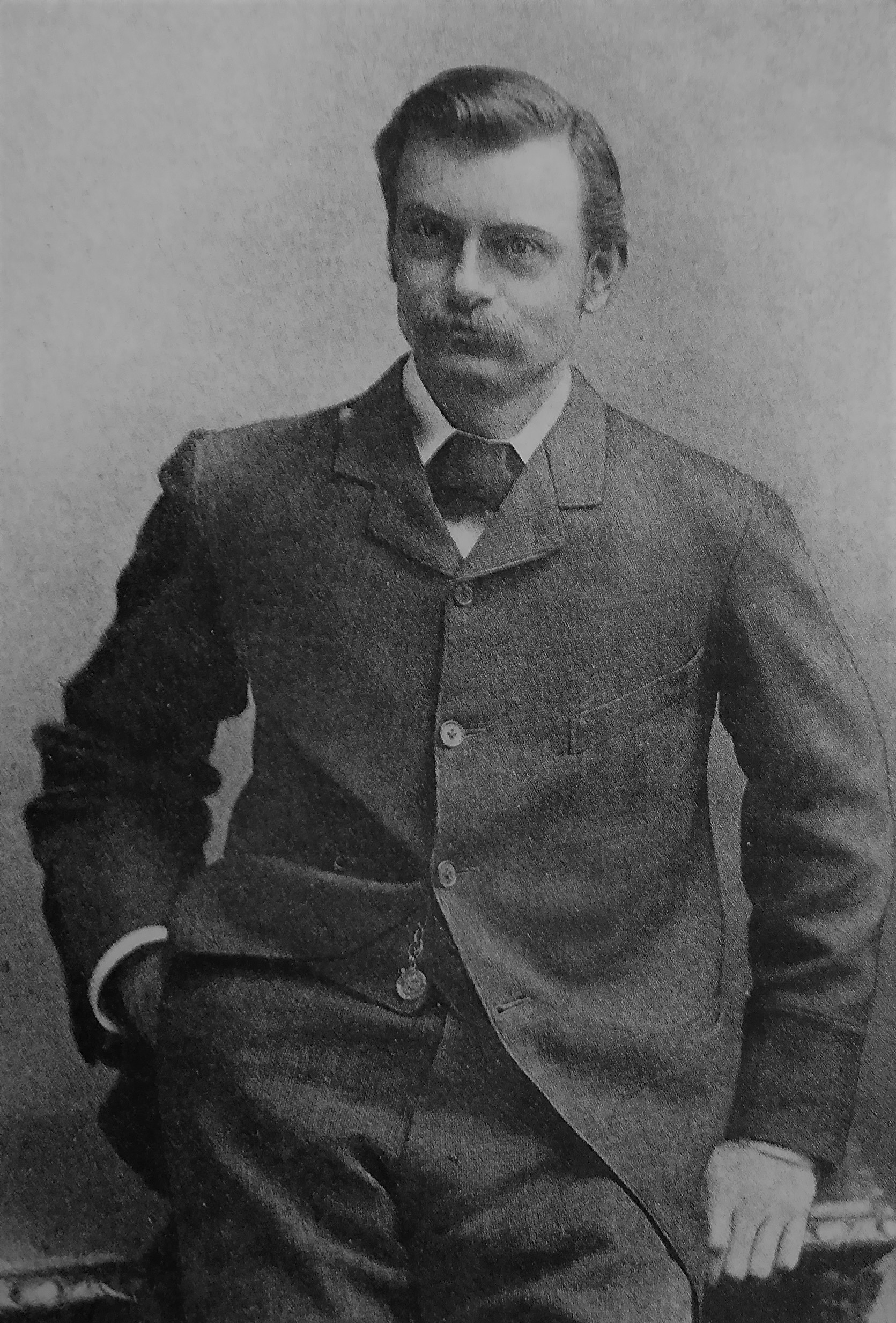
Arthur Milnes Marshall, 1890

Arthur Milnes Marshall (1852–1893) was an English zoologist, known also as an administrator at Victoria University.

== Life ==
Born in Birmingham on 8 June 1852, he was the third son of William P. Marshall, secretary of the Institution of Civil Engineers. In 1870, while still at school, he graduated B.A. at London University, and the following year entered St John's College, Cambridge, to read for the Natural Science Tripos. He was one of the first biology students following the reforms of Francis Balfour, and took the classes of Michael Foster. In 1874 he graduated B.A. with a top first, and was appointed in the early part of 1875 by Cambridge University to their table at the new Stazione Zoologica, Naples. In the summer of the same year he returned to Cambridge, and during the October term he joined Balfour in giving a course of lectures and laboratory work in zoology.

In 1877 Marshall won an open science scholarship at St Bartholomew's Hospital, and in the same year he passed the M.B. examination at Cambridge, obtained the London degree of D.Sc., and was elected to a fellowship at St John's College. He was appointed, in 1879, at the age of 27, to the newly-established professorship of zoology at Owens College, Manchester. There Marshall built a reputation as teacher and organiser. He was elected as a member of the Manchester Literary and Philosophical Society in December 1879.

He graduated M.A. in 1878 and M.D. in 1882. He was elected a Fellow of the Royal Society in 1885, and served on its council 1891–2. He was president of section D at the meeting of the British Association at Leeds in 1890, and gave one of the popular discourses before the British Association at the Edinburgh meeting in 1892.

As an administrative move, Owens College became part of Victoria University in 1880. There Marshall organised the courses of biological study. He was secretary, and subsequently chairman, of the board of studies. He was also secretary of the extension movement initiated by the university.

== Death ==
Marshall's main recreation was mountain climbing, despite the death of his friend Francis Balfour on Mont Blanc. In most long vacations he climbed in the Tyrol, Switzerland, or on the Mont Blanc chain; and he passed Easter and Christmas vacations on the mountains of Wales and of the English Lake District. On 31 December 1893, while he was engaged with friends in photographing the rocks of Deep Ghyll on Scafell, a rock gave way beneath him. Falling backwards, he was killed instantaneously. A cross was cut on the rocks below Lord's Rake to mark the spot where his body fell. He was unmarried.

== Works ==
Between 1878 and 1882 Marshall published in the Quarterly Journal of Microscopical Science "The Development of the Cranial Nerves in the Chick", 1878; "The Morphology of the Vertebrate Olfactory Organ", 1879; "Observations on the Cranial Nerves of Scyllium", 1881 (with W. Baldwin Spencer); "On the Head-cavities and associated Nerves of Elasmobranchs", 1881. In 1882 he published a memoir on "The Segmental Value of the Cranial Nerves" in the Journal of Anatomy and Physiology. With his later researches on the anatomy of Pennatulid corals, these papers form Marshall's significant contributions to zoology. A list of his major papers is in The Owens College, Manchester, 1900, pp. 210, 211.

Marshall wrote three text-books, The Frog (1882, 7th edit. 1900), Practical Zoology (with Charles Herbert Hurst) (1887, 5th edit. 1899), and Vertebrate Embryology (1893). Other works were Biological Essays and Addresses (1894), and The Darwinian Theory (1894). A pithy speaker, he put recapitulation theory in the form that animals "climb up their genealogical tree".
