= William Brand (botanist) =

Scottish solicitor, banker, botanist and plant collector (1807–1869)

William Brand WS FRSE
- Born: 5 January 1807; Peterhead, Aberdeenshire
- Died: 18 October 1869 (aged 62)
- Scientific career
- Fields: Botany

William Brand WS FRSE (5 January 1807, Peterhead, Aberdeenshire – 15 October 1869) was a Scottish solicitor, banker, botanist and plant collector.

== Biography ==
He was born in Peterhead in Scotland the son of Charles Brand, a farmer. He attended parish schools, and completed a medical degree at the university of Edinburgh. It was around this time that he grew an interest for botany.

After his studies, William Brand was apprenticed to Scott, Findlay and Balderston, rising to become a partner in 1834, the year he also became a Writer to the Signet. In 1836 he is shown as working from 18 Dundas Street in Edinburgh's New Town.

He served as secretary to the Union Bank of Scotland from 1846 to 1869.

He was a founding member of the Botanical Society of Edinburgh on 8 February 1836, and the discoverer of the Astragalus alpinus.

A bust of William Brand stands in the library of the Royal Botanic Garden Edinburgh.

== Distinctions ==
- 1863: Fellow of the Royal Society of Edinburgh

== Personal life ==
In 1848, William Brand married Eleanor Bruce Mitchell. They had 3 children.
