= Robert James Douglas Graham =

Scottish botanist (1884–1950)

Robert James Douglas Graham FRSE (1884–1950) was a Scottish botanist.

== Life ==
He was born on 20 July 1884 in Perth, the son of Dr John Thomas Graham. His family lived at 4 Athole Crescent in Perth. He was educated at Perth Academy then attended the University of St Andrews, graduating with an MA in 1904.

From 1910 to 1914 he served as economic botanist to the Indian Agricultural Service. In the First World War he served as a lieutenant colonel in the Indian Army Reserve. In 1919 and 1920 he was director of agriculture for Mesopotamia. In 1921 he went to the University of Edinburgh as a lecturer in botany.

In 1924 he was elected a fellow of the Royal Society of Edinburgh. His proposers were Sir William Wright Smith, Frederick Orpen Bower, Sir D'Arcy Wentworth Thompson and Robert Campbell. He served the society as secretary 1939 to 1944 and vice president 1944 to 1947.

In 1934 he became professor of botany at the University of St Andrews.

He died in St Andrews on 3 September 1950.

The standard author abbreviation R.J.D.Graham is used to indicate this person as the author when citing a botanical name.

== Family ==
He was married to Johanna (Oona) M. Reid.
