= James Hutton Institute =

Scottish research institution

The James Hutton Institute
- Predecessor: The Macaulay Land Use Research Institute and The Scottish Crop Research Institute
- Founded: 1 April 2011
- Headquarters: Dundee, Scotland
- Number of locations: 2; Aberdeen and Dundee
- Key people: Professor Colin Campbell, Chief Executive Professor Deb Roberts, Deputy Chief Executive and Executive Director of Science Professor Rob Brooker, Director of Science Anne Corbin, Chief Financial Officer
- Revenue: 35,803,000 pound sterling (2020)
- Subsidiaries: James Hutton Limited, Biomathematics and Statistics Scotland (BioSS)
- Website: www.hutton.ac.uk

The James Hutton Institute is an interdisciplinary scientific research institute in Scotland established in 2011, through the merger of Scottish Crop Research Institute (SCRI) and the Macaulay Land Use Research Institute. The institute, named after Scottish geologist James Hutton, one of the leading figures of the Scottish Enlightenment, combines existing Scottish expertise in agricultural research, soils and land use, and works in fields including food and energy security, biodiversity, and climate change. With more than 600 employees, the institute is among the largest research centres in the UK. It is a registered charity under Scottish law.

The institute has its main offices in Aberdeen and Dundee with farms and field research stations at Glensaugh and Balruddery. The Dundee site also hosts the Plant Sciences department of the University of Dundee.

The James Hutton Institute also formally contains Biomathematics and Statistics Scotland (BioSS) which has staff based in Edinburgh, Dundee, Aberdeen and Ayr. BioSS undertakes research, consultancy and training in mathematics and statistics as applied to agriculture, the environment, food and health. Strategic oversight of the development of BioSS is provided by a Strategic Planning Group composed of senior representatives from BioSS' principal stakeholders.

BioSS and the James Hutton Institute are two of a family of six organisations termed the Main Research Providers for the Scottish Government Rural and Environment Research and Analytical Services Division (RESAS).

In 2012, the institute announced that it was formally joining the Natural Capital Initiative, a leading UK partnership that brings together policymakers, scientists, business, industry to find the most effective ways safeguard important ecosystems and natural capital.

Projects led by the institute to establish an International Barley Hub (IBH) and an Advanced Plant Growth Centre (APGC) at the Dundee site have been supported through the Tay Cities Deal with a £62m investment. The new Crop Innovation Centre housing the IBH and APGC was opened in 2024 by First Minister John Swinney and Scottish Secretary Ian Murray.
