= James Montagu Frank Drummond =

Scottish botanist (1881–1965)

James Montagu Frank Drummond FRSE FLS (1881–1965) was a Scottish botanist, descended from a long line of botanists including James Drummond all living in the Inverarity area near Forfar, and mainly working on the Fotheringham estate. Friends generally knew him as Monty Drummond. He was an expert on Bryophytes.

== Life ==
He was born in 1881 the son of James Ramsay Drummond (1851–1921) (grandson of Thomas Drummond) and Elizabeth H. M. Drummond. He was a distant cousin to Rev Henry Drummond. Monty's father wrote botanical books on the flora of India, and Monty was born in India during one of his parents trips there.

He was educated at Cambridge University and graduated MA MSc. His working career began at the Armstrong College in Newcastle-upon-Tyne as a lecturer in botany. He then returned to Scotland lecturing in Plant Physiology at Glasgow University rising to Professor of Botany (1925–1930) and then transferring to the University of Manchester (1930–1946). On 9 December 1930 Professor J. M. F. Drummond, M.A., F.R.S.E. was elected to the membership of Manchester Literary and Philosophical Society while living in Fallowfield, Manchester.

Whilst in Scotland he was also Director of the Plant Breeding Station 1921–1925. Staff during his directorship included Frederick Whalley Sansome.

In 1923 he was elected a Fellow of the Royal Society of Edinburgh his proposers being Frederick Orpen Bower, Sir William Wright Smith, John Walter Gregory and Robert Kidston. He resigned from the society in 1945. He was President of the Botanical Society of Edinburgh for 1925–1927. He was also a Fellow of the Linnean Society.

He retired in 1946, being succeeded in Manchester University by Prof Eric Ashby. He died in Exmouth in Devon on 7 February 1965.

== Archive material ==
A series of letters between Drummond and Frederick Orpen Bower dating from 1912 to 1927 are held by the National Archive in Kew.

== Publications ==
- He translated Gottlieb Haberlandt’s Physiological Plant Anatomy into English (1914)
- Ecology and Plant Diversities
