= James Robert Matthews =

Scottish botanist (1889–1978)

James Robert Matthews FRSE FLS CBE LLD (1889–1978) was a Scottish botanist. He was president of the British Ecological Society in 1934 and president of the Botanical Society of Edinburgh 1939 to 1942.

== Life ==
He was born in the village of Dunning on 8 March 1889, the son of Janet (née McLean) and Robert Matthews. He was educated at the local school and then at Perth Academy. He then studied science at the University of Edinburgh, graduating with an MA in 1911. During the same period, he attended the Teacher Training at Moray College in Edinburgh, and qualified as a teacher in the same year. In 1911/12 he took a course in botany under Isaac Bayley Balfour.

In the year 1912/13, he taught at North Berwick Secondary School, then in 1913 he began lecturing in botany at Birkbeck College in London. In the First World War he was employed as a proto-zoologist at Western Command in Liverpool. Returning to Birkbeck after the war, in 1920 he moved to the University of Edinburgh as a lecturer and in 1929 obtained a post as professor of botany at Reading University. In 1934 he moved to the University of Aberdeen.

In 1924 he was elected a fellow of the Royal Society of Edinburgh. His proposers were Sir William Wright Smith, Frederick Orpen Bower, James Ritchie and James Hartley Ashworth. He was vice president of the society from 1958 to 1961, and won the society's Neil Prize for the period 1961–63.

In 1956 he was created a Commander of the Order of the British Empire (CBE) and was granted an honorary doctorate (LLD) from Aberdeen University in 1960.

He retired in 1959 and died on 12 April 1978 aged 89.

== Publications ==
- Some British Hybrid Roses (1910)
- The white Moss Loch (1914)

== Family ==
In 1928 he married Christine Young Blackhall.
