= List of botanical gardens in the United Kingdom =

Botanical gardens in the United Kingdom is a link page for any botanical garden, arboretum or pinetum in the United Kingdom.

== England ==
=== Berkshire ===
- Harris Garden, University of Reading, Reading

=== Birmingham ===
- Birmingham Botanical Gardens
- Winterbourne Botanic Garden, University of Birmingham

=== Bristol ===
- Bristol University Botanic Gardens

=== Cambridgeshire ===
- Cambridge University Botanic Garden, Cambridge

=== Cheshire ===
- Jodrell Bank Arboretum
- Lovell Quinta Arboretum, Jodrell Bank Estate
- Ness Botanic Gardens

=== Cornwall ===
- Eden Project
- Lost Gardens of Heligan
- Trebah

=== County Durham ===
- University of Durham Botanic Garden

=== Derbyshire ===
- Derby Arboretum

=== Devon ===
- Bicton Gardens
- Paignton Botanical Gardens, Paignton Zoo
- RHS Garden Rosemoor

=== Dorset ===
- Abbotsbury Subtropical Gardens

=== Essex ===
- Beth Chatto Gardens

=== Gloucestershire ===
- Batsford Arboretum
- Tortworth Court Arboretum
- Westonbirt Arboretum, Tetbury

=== Hampshire ===
- Exbury Gardens, Exbury
- Sir Harold Hillier Gardens, Romsey

=== Isles of Scilly ===
- Abbey Gardens, Tresco

=== Isle of Wight ===
- Ventnor Botanic Garden, Ventnor

=== Kent ===
- Bedgebury National Pinetum
- The World Garden at Lullingstone Castle

=== Lancashire ===
- Myerscough College

=== Leicestershire ===
- University of Leicester Botanic Garden, Oadby, including the nearby Attenborough Arboretum

=== Liverpool ===
- Wavertree Botanic Park and Gardens, Liverpool
- Calderstones/Harthill estate, Liverpool
- Southport Botanic Gardens

=== London ===
- Chelsea Physic Garden, Chelsea
- Crossrail Place Roof Garden
- Royal Botanic Gardens, Kew
- Medicinal Plant Garden, Royal College of Physicians of London, Regents Park
- Fulham Palace House & Garden, Fulham

=== Manchester ===
- RHS Garden Bridgewater Salford
- Firs Botanical Grounds Fallowfield
- Fletcher Moss Botanical Garden Didsbury

=== Newcastle upon Tyne ===
- Moorbank Botanic Gardens, Newcastle University (Now closed)

=== Northamptonshire ===
- Coton Manor Gardens, Coton, Northamptonshire
- Thenford House Arboretum & Gardens, Thenford

=== Nottinghamshire ===
- The Arboretum, Nottingham
- Sutton Bonington Arboretum, University of Nottingham

=== Oxfordshire ===
- University of Oxford Botanic Garden, Oxford
- Harcourt Arboretum, Nuneham Courtenay

=== Staffordshire ===
- National Memorial Arboretum, Alrewas

=== Somerset ===
- Bath Botanical Gardens at the Royal Victoria Park, Bath

=== Surrey ===
- Royal Botanic Gardens, Kew
- Royal Horticultural Society Gardens, Wisley
- Winkworth Arboretum

=== Sussex ===
- Borde Hill Garden, Haywards Heath
- Great Dixter
- Wakehurst Place (outstation of Royal Botanic Gardens, Kew)

=== Warwickshire ===
- Ryton Organic Gardens, headquarters of Garden Organic near Rugby, Warwickshire; associated with University of Coventry

=== Worcestershire ===
- Bodenham Arboretum

=== Yorkshire ===
- RHS Garden Harlow Carr
- Sheffield Botanical Gardens, Sheffield
- Thorp Perrow Arboretum, Bedale
- The Yorkshire Arboretum, Nr Malton
- Museum Gardens, York

== Scotland ==
=== Aberdeen ===
- Cruickshank Botanic Garden, Aberdeen

=== Argyll ===
- Benmore Botanic Garden, near Dunoon, first outstation of the Royal Botanic Garden Edinburgh
- Crarae Gardens, Inveraray

=== Dundee ===
- University of Dundee Botanic Garden

=== Edinburgh ===
- Royal Botanic Garden Edinburgh. The main site is in Edinburgh at Inverleith, with three "Regional Gardens":
  - Benmore Botanic Garden in Argyll, formerly known as the Younger Botanic Garden
  - Dawyck Botanic Garden in the Scottish Borders
  - Logan Botanic Garden in Galloway

=== Fife ===
- St Andrews Botanic Garden

=== Galloway ===
- Logan Botanic Garden, Port Logan, regional garden of the Royal Botanic Garden Edinburgh

=== Glasgow ===
- Glasgow Botanic Gardens

=== Inverness ===
- Inverness Botanic Garden, Bught Park, Inverness

=== Scottish Borders ===
- Dawyck Botanic Garden near Peebles, regional garden of the Royal Botanic Garden Edinburgh

== Wales ==
=== Carmarthenshire ===
- National Botanic Garden of Wales
- Gelli Aur Arboretum

=== Ceredigion ===
- Aberystwyth University Botanic Garden, Penglais

=== Gwynedd ===
- Treborth Botanic Garden - Bangor University

=== Glamorgan ===
- Cowbridge Physic Garden
- Dyffryn Gardens
- Roath Park Botanical Gardens

=== Swansea ===
- Clyne Gardens
- Singleton Botanical Gardens

== Northern Ireland ==
=== Belfast ===
- Belfast Botanic Gardens

=== County Down ===
- Castlewellan Arboretum & Gardens, Castlewellan Forest Park

== See also ==
- Botanical garden
- List of botanical gardens

The United Kingdom has a strong tradition of decorative gardening, and there are many well known gardens in the United Kingdom that are not botanical gardens. See:

- Gardens in England
- Gardens in Scotland
- Gardens in Wales
- Gardens in Northern Ireland
