= List of gardens in Scotland =

This is a list of gardens and botanic gardens in Scotland.

== Aberdeen ==
- Cruickshank Botanic Garden
- Duthie Park winter gardens

== Angus ==
- Edzell Castle
- Pitmuies

== Argyll and Bute ==
- Achamore Gardens on Gigha
- An Cala on Seil
- Ardkinglas Estate, Cairndow
- Ardnaiseig
- Arduaine
- Bargullan
- Colonsay House gardens
- Crarae, run by the National Trust for Scotland (NTS)
- Eckford Gardens
- Geilston Garden (formerly in Dunbartonshire)
- Strachur
- Torosay Castle and garden
- Younger Botanic Garden Benmore, a Regional Garden of the RBGE (see the entry for Edinburgh)

== Dumfries and Galloway ==
- Glenwhan Gardens
- Logan Botanic Garden, a Regional Garden of the RBGE
- Threave Gardens, (NTS)

== Dundee ==
- Dundee Botanic Garden

== East Lothian ==
- Inveresk Lodge Garden, (NTS)

== East Renfrewshire ==
- Greenbank Garden

== Edinburgh ==
- Princes Street Gardens
- Royal Botanic Garden Edinburgh (RBGE) at Inverleith
- Hermiston Suntrap

== Fife ==
- St Andrews Botanic Garden
- Kellie Castle

== Glasgow ==
- Glasgow Botanic Gardens

== Highland ==
- Abriachan Nurseries
- Ardtornish, Morvern
- Armadale Castle
- Balmacara Woodland Gardens, (NTS)
- Cawdor Castle and Gardens, Nairn
- Dunrobin Castle, Sutherland
- Dunvegan Castle, Skye
- Inverewe Garden, Poolewe, (NTS)
- Làrach Mòr, Arisaig
- Castle of Mey, Caithness

== Inverness-shire ==
- Inverness Botanic Garden

== Orkney ==
- Happy Valley (garden)

== Perth and Kinross ==
- Branklyn Garden, (NTS)
- Cluny House Gardens
- Drummond Castle Garden

== Scottish Borders ==
- Dawyck Botanic Garden, a Regional Garden of the RBGE
- Harmony Garden, Melrose, (NTS)
- Kailzie Gardens
- Manderston
- Priorwood Garden, (NTS)

== South Lanarkshire ==
- Little Sparta, Dunsyre, Lanark

== See also ==
- List of botanical gardens in the United Kingdom
- Gardens in England
- Gardens in Wales
- Gardens in Northern Ireland
