= Gardening in Scotland =

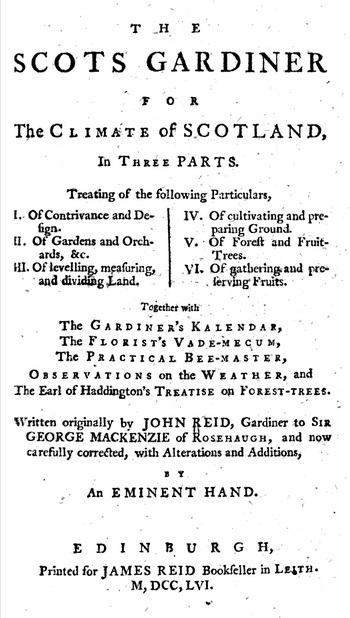
John Reid, The Scots Gard'ner, 1683, the first gardening book printed in Scotland

Gardening in Scotland, the design of planned spaces set aside for the display, cultivation, and enjoyment of plants and other forms of nature in Scotland began in the Middle Ages.

Gardens, or yards, around medieval abbeys, castles and houses were formal and in the European tradition of herb garden, kitchen garden and orchard. The first Renaissance style gardens in Scotland were built for the Stewart dynasty at their royal palaces. Members of the nobility and gentry followed suit. From the late sixteenth century, the landscaping of many estate houses was influenced by Italian Renaissance gardens. From this period there are many examples of formal gardens created for nobles, gentry and lairds. The legacy of the Auld Alliance and the beginnings of the grand tour meant that French styles were particularly important in Scotland, although adapted for the Scottish climate. In the late seventeenth century William Bruce put Scotland at the forefront of European garden design.

In the eighteenth century there was a reaction against the "absolutism" and "popery" of the French court and a retreat from the expense of maintaining large formal gardens. The move to a less formal landscape of parklands and irregular clumps of planting, associated in England with Capability Brown, was dominated in Scotland by his followers, Robert Robinson and Thomas White senior and junior. New ideas about gardening developed in the nineteenth century including the writings of Humphry Repton. The mid-nineteenth century saw the beginnings of formal public parks.

In the early twentieth century Scottish plant collectors continued to be highly active. Gardening began to be a major pursuit of the working and middle classes in the twentieth century. Some major planned gardens were created in the twentieth century including Ian Hamilton Finlay's Little Sparta and Charles Jencks' post-modern Garden of Cosmic Speculation.

== Middle Ages and Renaissance ==
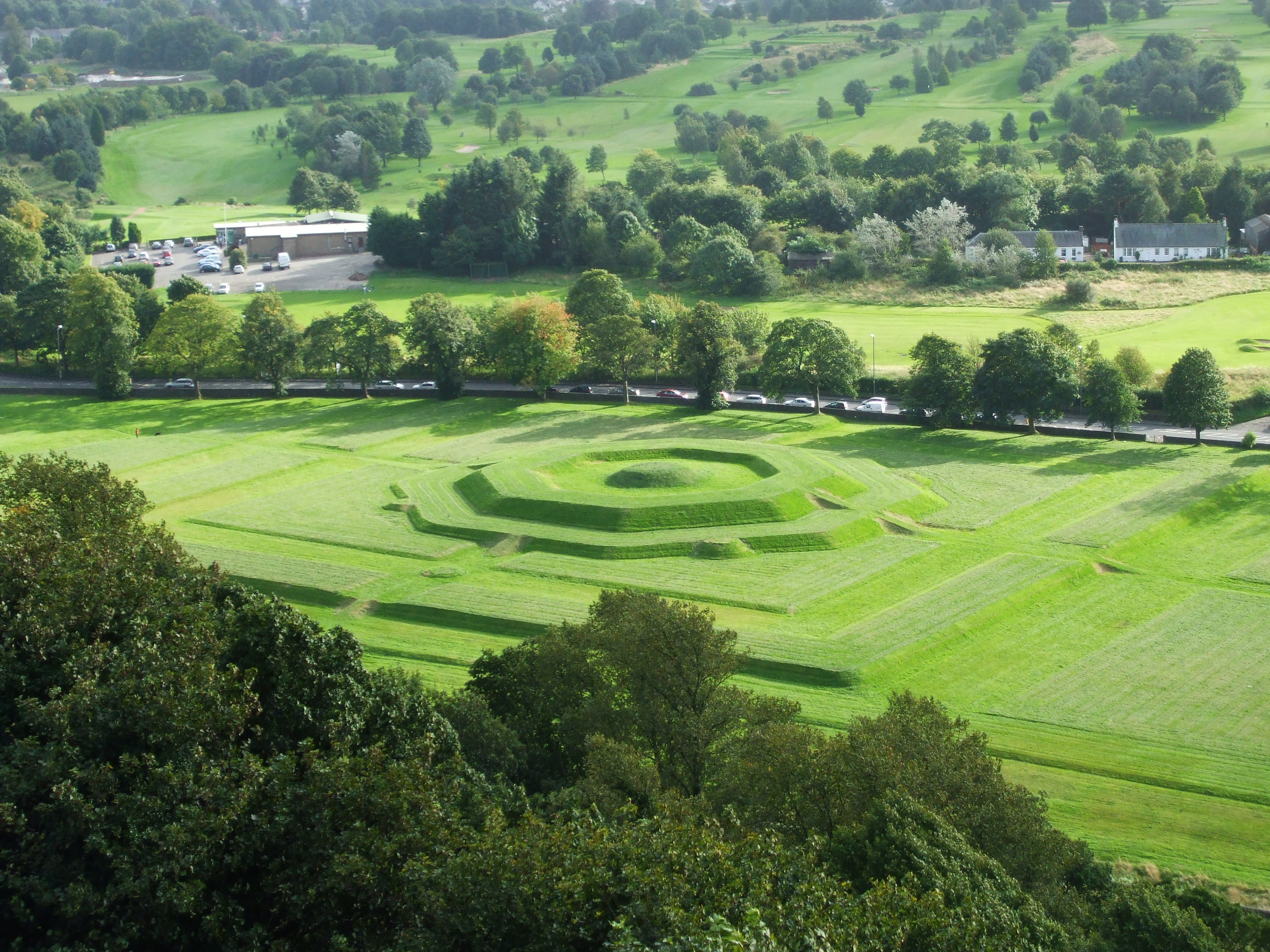
The King's Knot Garden below Stirling Castle

Gardens, as designated spaces for planting, first came to Scotland with Christianity and monasticism from the sixth century. The monastery of Iona had such a garden for medicinal herbs and other plants and tended by an Irish gardener from the time of Columba (521–597). By the late Middle Ages gardens, or yards, around medieval abbeys, castles and houses were formal and in the European tradition of herb garden, kitchen garden and orchard. Such gardens are known to have been present at Pluscarden Priory, Beauly Priory and Kinloss Abbey and created for the Bishop of Moray at Spynie in the mid-sixteenth century. The gardens of castles and estate houses were often surrounded by defensive walls and they sometimes adjoined a hunting park. Urban houses had gardens as part of burgage plots that stretched behind houses, often used to produce vegetables such as kale and beans.

The first Renaissance-style gardens in Scotland were built for the Stewart dynasty at their royal palaces. French gardeners were hired by James IV at Stirling Castle in 1501, where the King's Knot Garden was developed and at Holyrood Palace around 1504, where the gardens were probably remodelled from monastic gardens. A "Queen's Garden" was created there in 1511. The gardens at both Stirling and Holyrood were overseen by a priest, Sir John Sharp. James V remodelled the gardens at Holyrood again in 1536, employing the Frenchman Bertrand Gallotre at both Holyrood and Stirling. At Holyrood the ditches surrounding the gardens were improved and the ponds drained. Archaeological remains indicate there were sophisticated formal gardens. John Morrison became the chief gardener of the south side of the palace in 1546 and remained there until 1598. During the personal reign of Mary, Queen of Scots (1561–67), there was an emphasis on herbs and vegetables. The ponds may have been permanently drained in this period and the monastic areas were planted with trees to make orchards and pleasant walking areas. Similar landscaping is also found at Falkland Palace and Linlithgow Palace.

Members of the nobility and gentry followed suit, with gardens recorded for Hugh Rose of Kilravock, built in 1536, and for the Seatons of Touch at Greenknowe Tower, which had gardens and avenues surrounding it. The gardens at Kinloss were improved by William Luban of Dieppe after his arrival in Scotland in 1540 and four years later he created the garden around the new palace at Beauly.

== Early Modern ==
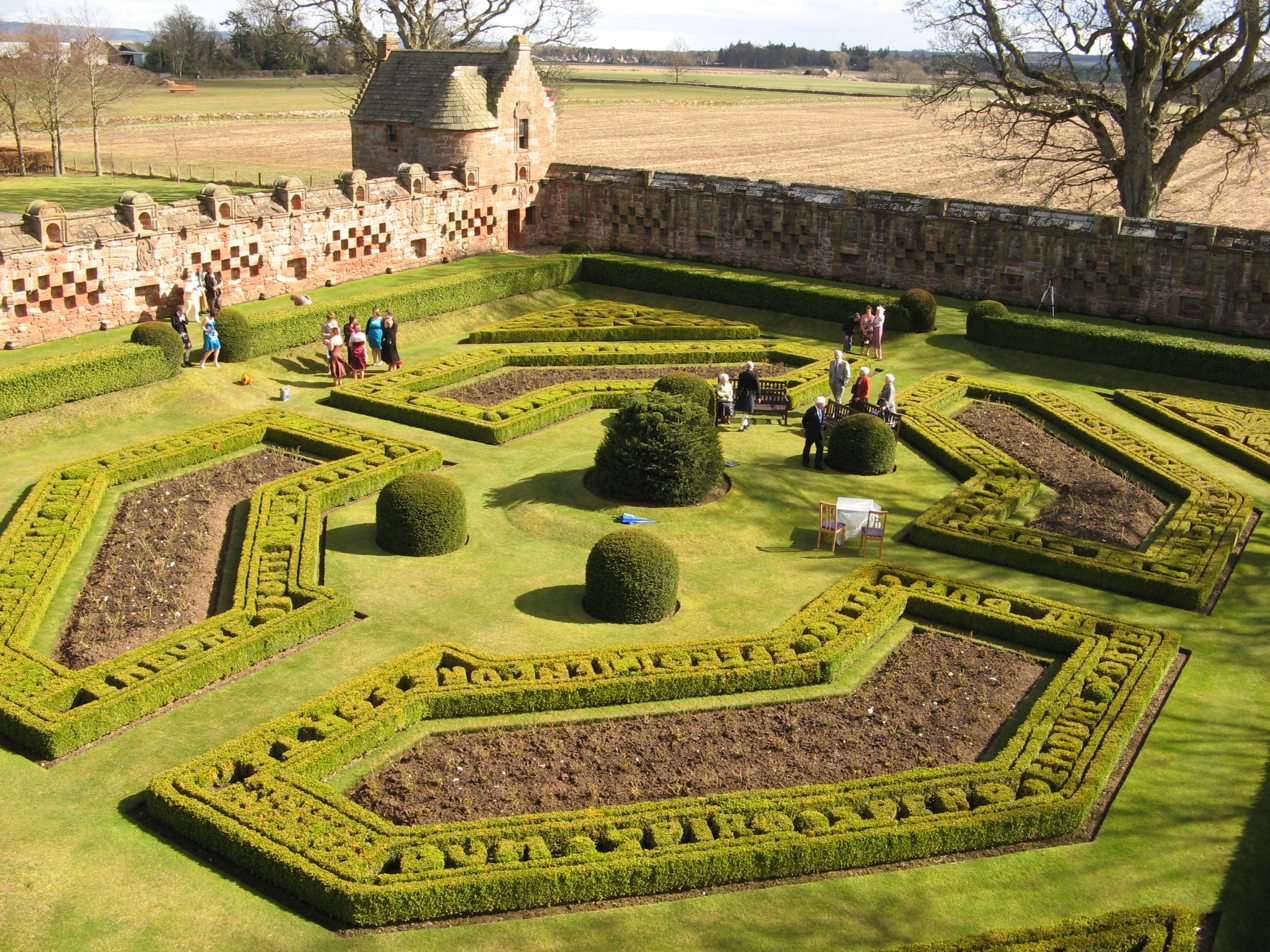
The restored formal walled garden at Edzell Castle

Although relatively few early modern gardens have survived unchanged, they can be seen in the maps of Timothy Pont (c. 1565–1614) from the 1590s, which depict abbeys, castles and estate houses surrounded by greenery, earthworks, orchards and arboretums. From the late sixteenth century, the landscaping of many estate houses was influenced by Italian Renaissance gardens. These were seen as retreats from the troubles of the world and were eulogised in country house poetry like that of William Drummond of Hawthornden (1585–1649).

From this period there are many examples of formal gardens created for nobles, gentry and lairds. By the end of the seventeenth century there were at least 141 formal gardens and orchards in Scotland. The gardens of Aberdour Castle were redeveloped along with the building for the regent James Douglas, 4th Earl of Morton (c. 1516–81), perhaps as an area for public display. Extensive gardens were developed at Pinkie House by Alexander Seton, 1st Earl of Dunfermline (1555–1622), with lawns, fountains, ponds and aviaries, designed for the entertainment of guests. Dunfermline's nephew, George Seton, 3rd Earl of Winton (1584–1650), planted a herb garden at Seton Palace in 1620. The Earl of Sutherland's castle at Dunrobin was surrounded by orchards, herbs and flowers. The best surviving garden from the early seventeenth century is that at Edzell Castle, where, between 1604 and 1610, David Lindsay (1551?–1610) created an enclosure of Renaissance-style walls, adorned with sculptures of the seven Cardinal Virtues, the seven Liberal Arts and the seven Planetary Deities, the expense of which eventually bankrupted him. The change to walled gardens may have been because of a change of attitudes to smells, with the walls helping to intensify the scent of the herbs and flowers that grew there.

Mary Sutton, Countess of Home had a terraced garden in Edinburgh's Canongate, at Moray House from the 1620s (now destroyed). She had inventories made of the trees and walks. The planting probably reflected other gardens in Edinburgh, but also would have responded to her experience of English gardens and the style of her cousin Lucy Russell, Countess of Bedford, particularly at Bedford House. The legacy of the Auld Alliance and the beginnings of the grand tour meant that French styles were particularly important in Scotland, although adapted for the Scottish climate. From the late seventeenth century the gardens at Versailles, with their formal avenues, parterres, and fountains that stressed symmetry and order, were a model. After the Glorious Revolution Dutch influences were also significant, with uniform planting and topiary.

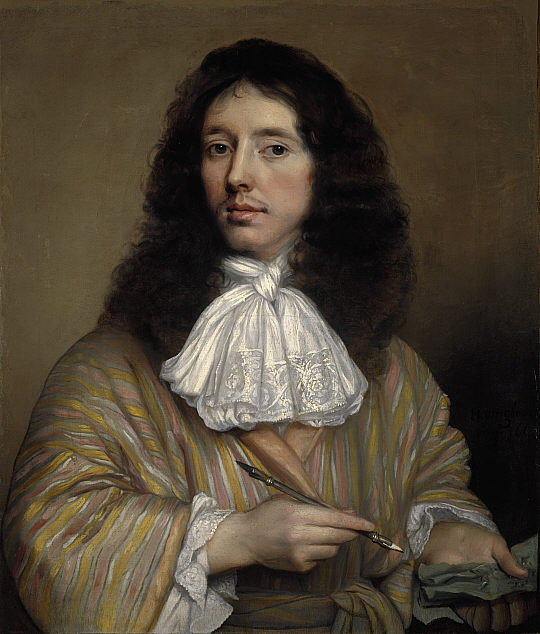
Portrait of William Bruce by John Michael Wright, c. 1664

Gardening books from the continent and England became widely available in this period and the first gardening book was published in Scotland. This was John Reid's, Scots Gard'ner (1683). Reid had been gardener at Niddry Castle, Hamilton Castle, and Drummond Castle and for George Mackenzie of Rosehaugh. The book borrowed from John Evelyn's (1658) translation of Nicholas de Bonnefon's Le jardinier françois (1651), adapting its ideas for Scottish conditions.

In the late seventeenth century William Bruce (c. 1630–1710) put Scotland at the forefront of European garden design. He lowered garden walls to incorporate the surrounding countryside into the vista. This allowed a focus on significant landscape features such as Bass rock at Balcaskie and Loch Leven Castle at Kinross. Alexander Edward (1651–1708) continued in the tradition established by Bruce, adding landscapes at houses including Hamilton Palace and Kinnaird castle, Angus. Grand schemes in the French tradition included James Douglas, 2nd Duke of Queensberry's (1662–1711) reworking of the terraces at Drumlanrig Castle, which incorporated the Douglas family crest into the parterres design. There is also the militaristic earthworks undertaken for Field Marshal John Dalrymple, 2nd Earl of Stair (1679–1747) at Castle Kennedy, Wigtownshire. The Earl of Mar's palace at Alloa was the grandest realisation of the Versailles style gardens in Scotland: it included canals, parterres, statues and ornamental trees. Common features in gardens of this period were elaborate sundials, such as the one created by John Mylne (c. 1589–1657) at Holyrood (1633) and that at Newbattle Abbey. The Royal Botanic Garden Edinburgh was founded in 1670, as a physic garden by combining the collections of doctor Robert Sibbald and botanist Andrew Balfour as a source of medicines. A physic garden was founded at the University of Glasgow in 1703.

== Eighteenth century ==
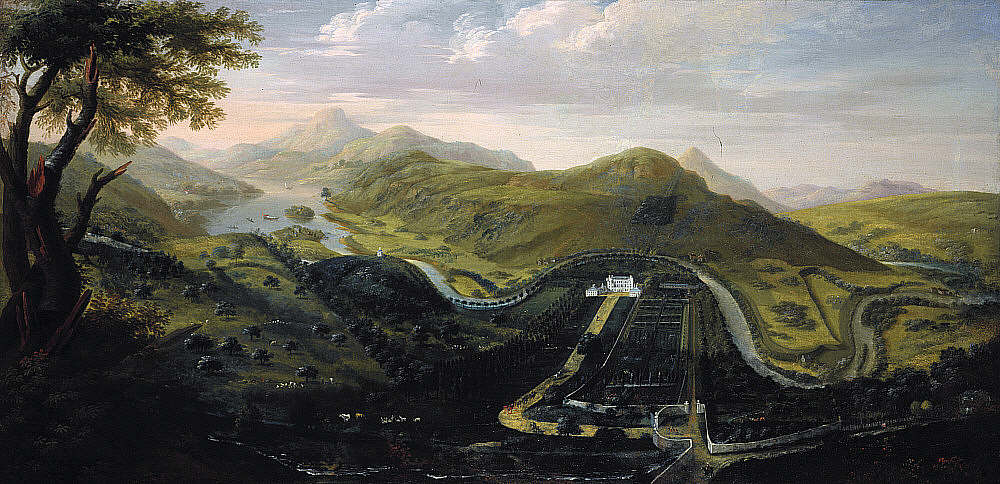
Taymouth Castle painted in 1733 by James Norie, showing William Adam's improvements to the house and gardens

In the eighteenth century there was a reaction against the "absolutism" and "popery" of the French court and a retreat from the expense of maintaining large formal gardens. Less symmetrical layouts became common with the development of the "natural" style of the jardin anglais, which attempted to create vistas of a rural idyll. The antiquarian John Clerk of Pennycuik (1676–1755), one of the key figures in defining elite taste in Scotland, eulogising the estate garden in his poem The Country Seat (1727), which built on the ideas of Alexander Pope. He created gardens at Mavisbank and Penicuik, Midlothian, with the help of architect William Adam (1689–1748), which combined formality with undulating ground. Adam laid down that "the rising and falling of the ground are to be humoured and make the greatest Beauteys in gardens". Adam's work included the landscaped park and avenue at Yester House and Hopetoun House, where the landscaped garden was reminiscent of a Roman campagnia.

The move to a less formal landscape of parklands and irregular clumps of planting, associated in England with Capability Brown (1716–1783), was dominated in Scotland by his followers, Robert Robinson and Thomas White senior and junior. From 1770 and 1809 the Whites were involved in the planning of over 70 estate gardens in Scotland, including those at Glamis Castle and Scone Palace. Important publications included James Justice's The Scottish Gardiner's Director (1754) and the reputation of Scottish gardeners in managing greenhouses, hot walls and the cultivation of fruit trees meant that they began to be in demand in England. At the end of eighteenth century there began to be a reaction to the English style of garden, influenced by picturesque taste and the spread of Ossianic Romanticism, which encouraged gardens in the wild. This resulted in creation of features like Ossian's Hall of Mirrors at the Hermitage Dunkeld and the Hermit's Cave at the Falls of Acharn, which put an emphasis on concealment and the surprise revelation of the natural.

Lower down the social scale, gardening for many crofters and agricultural labourers was focused around a small area near their house, in Shetland, and to a lesser extent in Orkney, it was often a small drystone enclosure known as a planticrue, which was particularly used for the growing of cabbages, and in the lowlands it was a kailyard, which produced greens and later potatoes, that were an important part of the family diet. Originally "exotic" plants, like turnips, onions, potatoes and rhubarb were exclusive to physic gardens, prized for their medicinal and nutritional value, and then were adopted by the upper classes, but gradually spread out to the gardens of ordinary people. This process was encouraged by figures such as John Hope (1725–1786), who was king's botanist in Edinburgh from 1761 and later Regius Professor of botany and medicine.

== Nineteenth century ==
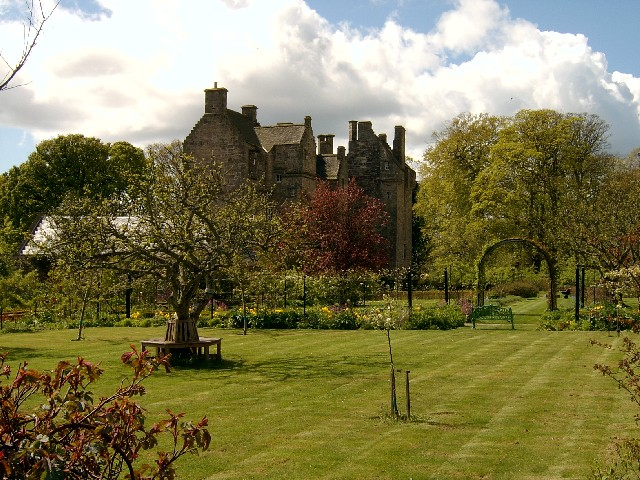
Kellie Castle Gardens

New ideas about gardening developed in the nineteenth century. The writings of Humphrey Repton (1752–1818) were highly influential in the return of the formal garden near to the major house. His sons were directly involved in the restructuring of the landscape at Valleyfield, Fife. Walter Scott's dislike of the sweeping away of the old formal gardens was also influential in creating an emphasis on preservation and restoration. His ideas were taken up by John Claudius Loudon (1783–1843), the most prolific gardening author of the century in Britain, and were highly influential throughout the world. By 1850 ambitious formal gardens had been recreated at Drummond Castle, Dunrobin and Drumlandrig.

New plants from around the world, often discovered and sampled by Scots such as David Douglas (1799–1834) and John Jeffrey (1826–54), and including the rhododendron and monkey puzzle tree, meant that Victorian and Edwardian gardens were characterised by an eclectic mix of the formal, picturesque, and gardenesque. By the end of the century the ideas of William Robinson (1838–1935), Gertrude Jekyll (1843–1932) and the Edinburgh-based Frances Hope (d. 1880), arguing for informal flower-based gardens, had begun to dominate. They resulted in a revival of the seventeenth-century mixed flower and kitchen garden, as carried out at Kellie Castle, and Earlshall Castle, Fife by Robert Lorimer.

The mid-nineteenth century saw the beginnings of formal public parks. Designers included Joseph Paxton (1803–1865), who developed Kelvingrove Park and Queen's Park in Glasgow and the Public Park, Dumfirmline. James Whitton became director of public parks in Glasgow and played a leading role in the development of parks towards the end of the century. The mild climate and soils of western Scotland facilitated the creation of special plantsman's gardens at Crarae, Arduaine and Younger Botanic Garden in Argyllshire and at Inverewe, Sutherland and Logan Botanic Garden, Wigtownshire.

== Twentieth century to the present ==
Scottish plant collectors continued to be highly active in the early twentieth century. George Forest (1873–1932) undertook seven expeditions to Western China between 1904 and 1932, bringing back over 30,000 botanical specimens. Other major figures in the field included Euan Cox (1893–1977) and George Sheriff (1898–1967).

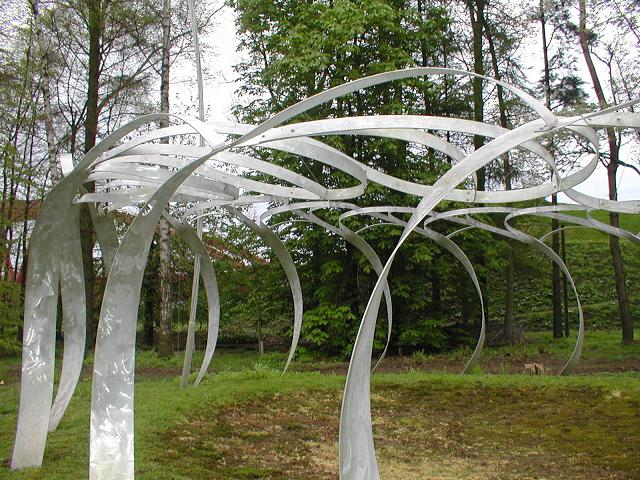
Charles Jencks's Garden of Cosmic Speculation

Some major planned gardens were created in the twentieth century. Ian Hamilton Finlay's (1925–2006) garden of Little Sparta opened in 1960, combining landscape, sculpture and concrete poetry. The American-born Charles Jencks (b. 1939) has developed a number of landscape and sculpture gardens in Scotland, including the post-modern Garden of Cosmic Speculation near Dumfriesshire, begun in 1988, which incorporates elements of the history of the cosmos into traditional designs.

Both The National Trust for Scotland and Scotland's Gardens were founded in 1931. The National Trust owns and maintains many major gardens, particularly those associated with palaces, castles and estate houses. The Scotland's Gardens scheme opens gardens not normally seen by the public, using the proceeds to fund charities.

Gardening began to be a major pursuit of the working and middle classes in the twentieth century. In the inter-war period there was a concerted attempt to encourage working-class men to abandon their traditional leisure activities in favour of activity in the garden, which was often given over to vegetable growing. Gardens were a deliberate part of the council housing schemes of the period, although the high density housing used in Scotland meant that there was less provision on the garden-suburb model than in England. Allotments were seen as one solution and by 1939 there were over 20,000 in Scotland. It was among the middle classes that domestic gardening took off in this period, fuelled by horticultural shows, open gardens, items in newspapers and increasing use of landscape features.

In the post-war period there were increasing numbers of people who possessed gardens. This resulted in increased information on gardening on radio and TV. In 1978 the BBC began to broadcast The Beechgrove Garden, filmed in Scotland and aimed at the owners of suburban semi-detached houses. The twentieth and twenty-first centuries saw a huge increase in do-it-yourself gardening books and magazines.

== See also ==
- List of gardens in Scotland
- Inventory of Gardens and Designed Landscapes in Scotland
- Gardening in Australia
- Gardening in New Zealand
- Gardening in Spain
