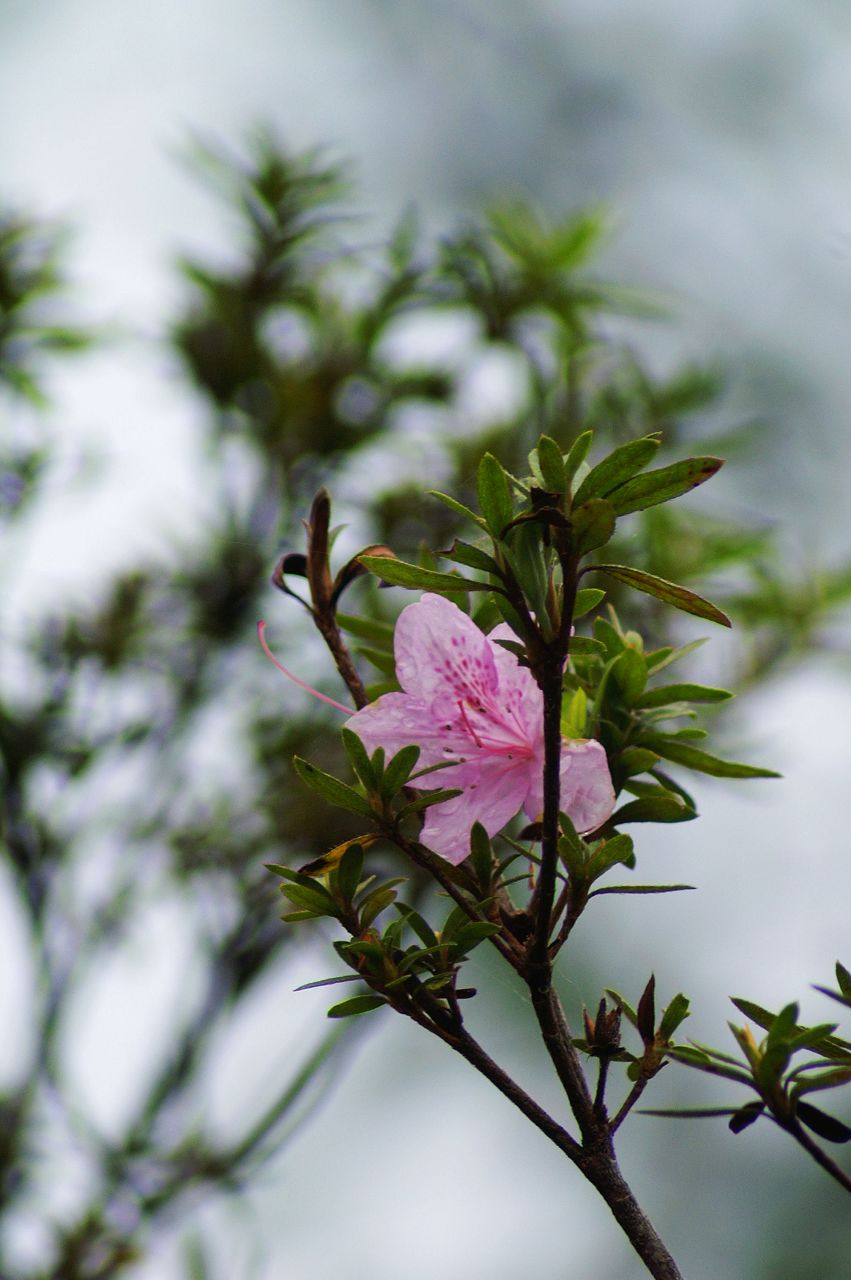

Conservation status
- Extinct in the Wild (IUCN 2.3)

Scientific classification
- Kingdom: Plantae
- Clade: Tracheophytes
- Clade: Angiosperms
- Clade: Eudicots
- Clade: Asterids
- Order: Ericales
- Family: Ericaceae
- Genus: Rhododendron
- Section: Rhododendron sect. Tsutsusi
- Species: R. kanehirai

Binomial name
- Rhododendron kanehirai E.H.Wilson

= Rhododendron kanehirai =

Species of flowering plant

Rhododendron kanehirai is a species of plant in the family Ericaceae. It was originally endemic to Taiwan. It has become extinct in the wild, though it still exists in cultivated form.

Botanic collections include those at Logan Botanic Garden where the Rhododendron is grown for preservation and display.
