= Edward Kemp (horticulturist) =

Edward Edmund Kemp MBE (26 July 1910 – 7 July 2012), known as Eddie Kemp, was a Scottish horticulturist. He served as curator of the Royal Botanic Garden Edinburgh from 1950 to 1971, then as the founding curator of the University of Dundee Botanic Garden from 1971 to 1980.

Kemp was appointed MBE in 1959. He received the honorary degrees of Doctor of Laws from the University of Dundee in 1980, and of Doctor of Letters from Heriot-Watt University in 1982. In 2010, shortly after his hundredth birthday, Kemp became the first recipient of the Royal Botanic Garden Edinburgh Medal.

In 1954, Kemp married Helen Dunbar, ex-wife of William Collier (4th Baron Monkswell, renounced peerage). Kemp was therefore step-father to Gerard Collier, 5th Baron Monkswell.
