= West End, Dundee =

Area of Dundee, Scotland

Coordinates: 56.456350°N 2.996222°W

West End
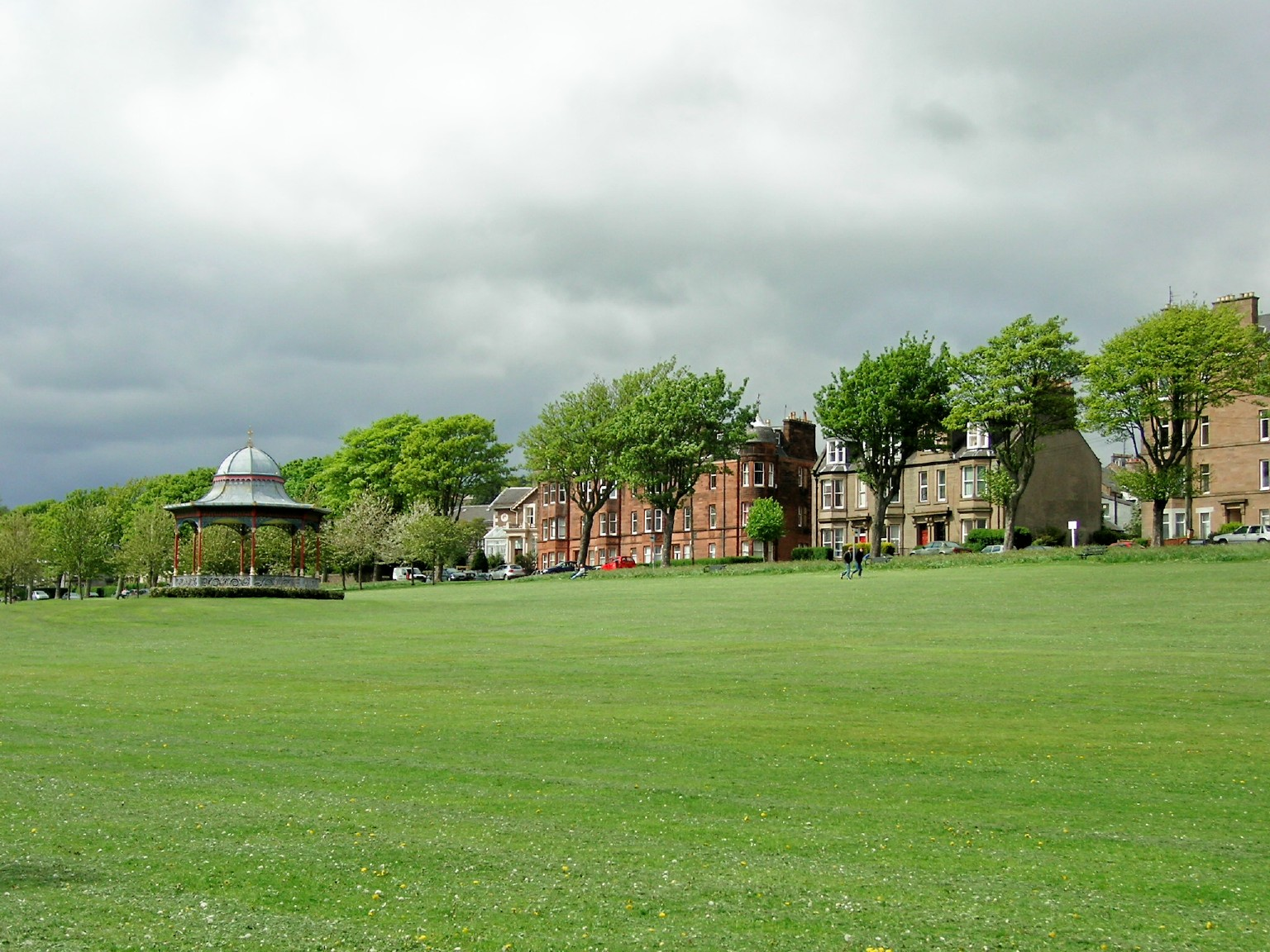
- Magdalen Green and Bandstand

- Location within Dundee City council area Location within Scotland
- Population: 11,941
- OS grid reference: NO387298
- Council area: Dundee City
- Lieutenancy area: Dundee
- Country: Scotland
- Sovereign state: United Kingdom
- Post town: DUNDEE
- Postcode district: DD2
- Dialling code: 01382
- Police: Scotland
- Fire: Scottish
- Ambulance: Scottish
- UK Parliament: Dundee West
- Scottish Parliament: Dundee City West

The West End is an area of Dundee, Scotland. Bordered to the south by the River Tay, to the north by Blackness and to the east by the city centre, the West End is primarily an affluent residential area surrounding its main commercial thoroughfare, Perth Road, and the main campus of the University of Dundee.

Since 1998, the city council has developed a "Cultural Quarter" at the boundary between the city centre and the West End which is now home to the Dundee Repertory Theatre, the Whitehall Theatre, the Dundee Science Centre and Dundee Contemporary Arts building as well as other commercial galleries and studios, and the university's Duncan of Jordanstone College of Art and Design.

== Landmarks ==
The University of Dundee is located in this area and provides a focal point for some 20,000 students. The neighbourhood is also home to St Andrew’s Roman Catholic Cathedral, the Morgan Tower, an 18th-century tenement which is now a pharmacy – and Blackness Library located further west at the Sinderins: the area where Perth Road and the Hawkhill diverge once forming a major entry point to Dundee. Harris Academy, Dundee's oldest and largest secondary school is also located in the West End area of Dundee on Perth Road.

The university's Botanic Gardens and sports facilities are located by the river next to Dundee Airport. The university’s College of Life Sciences located on Hawkhill incorporates the Wellcome Trust Biocentre, Sir James W. Black Centre, MRC Protein Phosphorylation Unit and Cancer Research UK Centre laboratories.

== Character of area ==
The district has many shops, bars, restaurants and hotels although this is balanced by many residential properties especially heading west. The area has traditionally been more affluent with many large Edwardian period houses compared to the large proportion of tenements built to house workers, primarily those involved in the Jute industry, in other sectors of the city. The housing in the area is popular among students due to its proximity to the university. The West End has been subject to a large degree of studentification. By attracting people from across the UK and other countries, the university district has evolved a separate identity within Dundee. Town and gown relations are generally cordial, although issues such as Houses in multiple occupation (HMOs) and parking difficulties are amongst the problems between the indigenous population and the University.

== Governance ==
With the 2007 re-organisation of wards for elections to Dundee City Council there is now a large West End Ward, which was created with the amalgamation of the Tay Bridges, Riverside, and Logie wards. The councillors for the area are currently Fraser Macpherson (Liberal Democrat), Bill Campbell, (Scottish National Party), Donald Hay (Scottish Conservatives) and Richard McCready (Labour).
