= Plant Heritage =

UK botanical conservation organisation

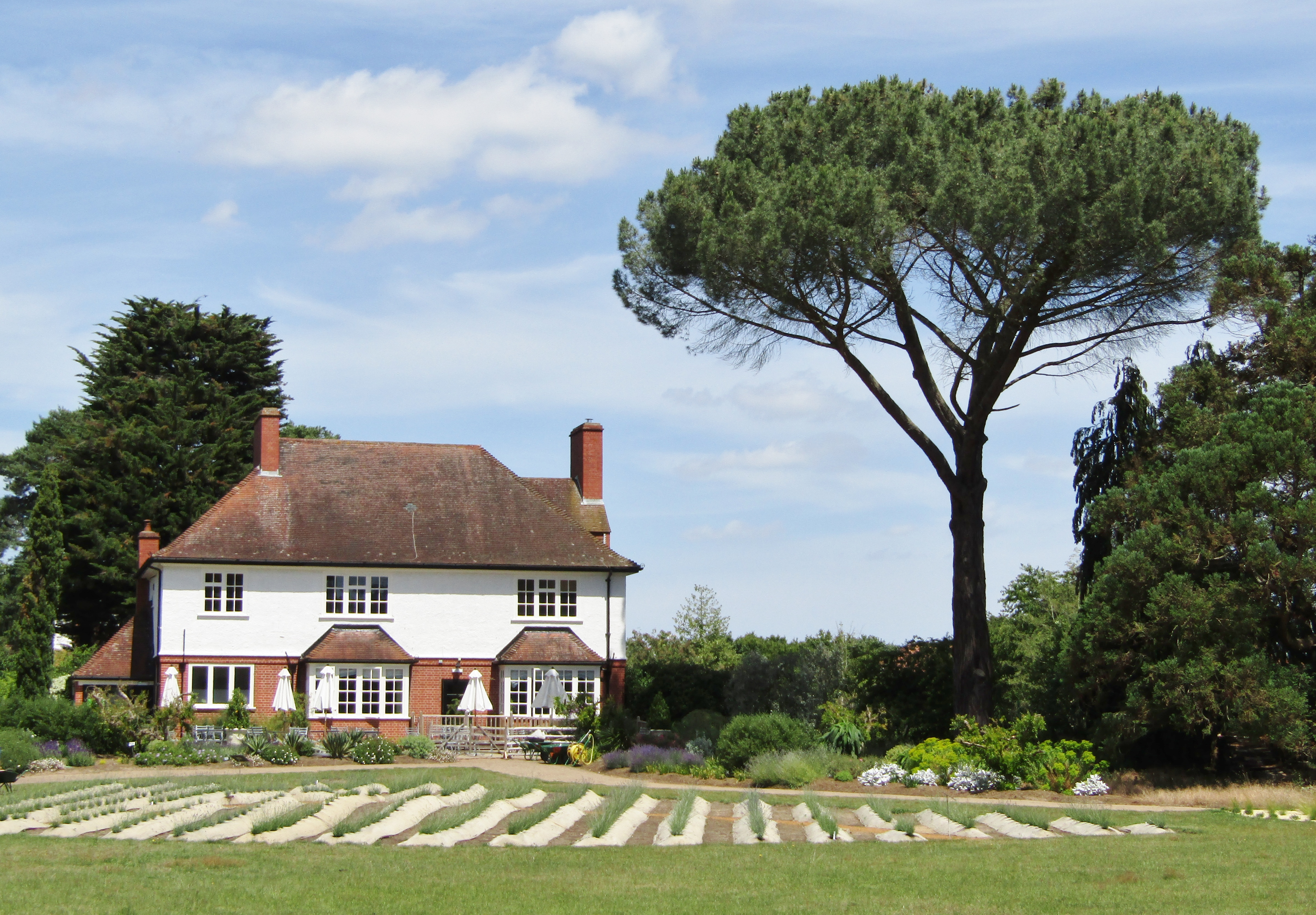
- Registered office on the grounds of RHS Garden Wisley
- Formation: 1978
- Type: Registered charity
- Headquarters: Wisley
- Region served: United Kingdom
- President: Alan Titchmarsh
- Website: Official website

Plant Heritage, formerly the National Council for the Conservation of Plants and Gardens (NCCPG), is a British registered charity and a botanical conservation organisation based in Wisley, Surrey. It was founded in 1978 to combine the talents of botanists, horticulturalists and conservationists with the dedication of keen amateur and professional gardeners. The mission statement of the organisation declares that "The NCCPG seeks to conserve, document, promote and make available Britain and Ireland's rich biodiversity of garden plants for the benefit of everyone through horticulture, education and science." Specifically, the aims of the organisation are to:

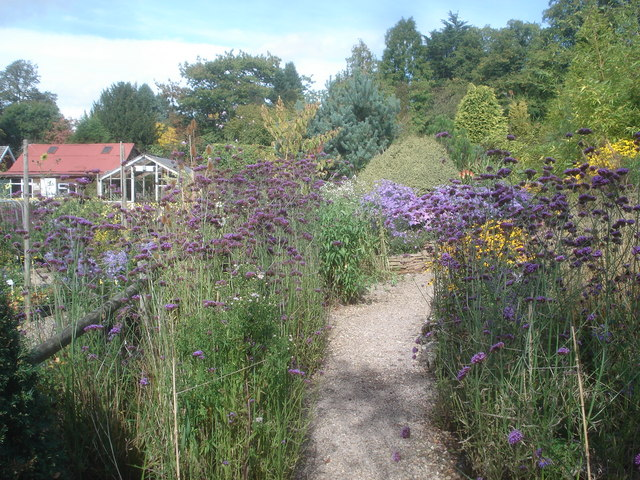
Old Court Nurseries and Picton Garden in Colwall, Herefordshire holds the Plant Heritage collection of asters

- encourage the propagation and conservation of endangered garden plants in the British Isles, both species and cultivars;
- encourage and conduct research into cultivated plants, their origins, their historical and cultural importance and their environments; and
- encourage the education of the public in garden plant conservation.

Through its membership and the National Plant Collection holders, Plant Heritage seeks to rediscover and reintroduce endangered garden plants by encouraging their propagation and distribution so that they are grown as widely as possible. The charity works closely with other conservation bodies such as botanic gardens, the National Trust, the National Trust for Scotland, English Heritage, the Royal Horticultural Society and many specialist horticultural societies.

Plant Heritage's patron is King Charles III.

In 2010, the television gardener Alan Titchmarsh became president of the charity.

== See also ==
- Heirloom plant
- List of botanical gardens in the United Kingdom
- Plant Collections Network
