= Inverness Botanic Garden =

Scottish botanical garden

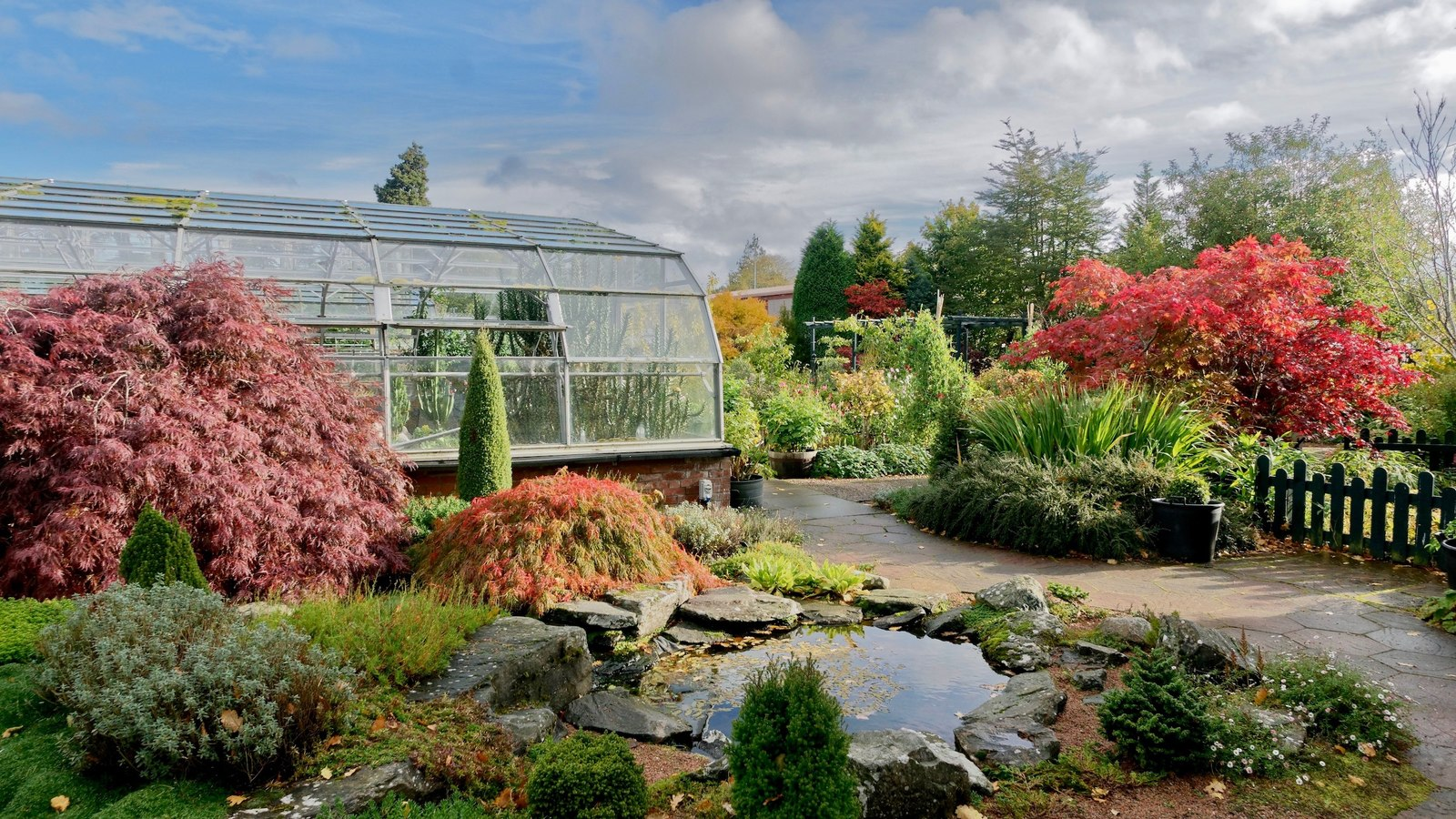
- Inverness Botanic Garden

- Location within Scotland
- Type: Botanical garden
- Location: Scotland
- Coordinates: 57.4629°N 4.2399°W
- Opened: 1993
- Website: www.highlifehighland.com/inverness-botanic-gardens

Inverness Botanic Garden is a botanical garden in Bught Park, Inverness, Scotland.

== History ==
Inverness Botanic Garden is the most northerly botanic garden in the United Kingdom. Opened by Prince Edward, Duke of Edinburgh in 1993, it is home to two glasshouses: a humid tropical house and a cactus house. There are also gardens which are used for local education purposes, as well as kitchen garden and onsite cafe.

The gardens lie on the grounds of an 18th-century stately home, Bught House. The walled garden once attached to the house now forms the modern garden.

Within the trees in the garden is a Himalayan birch.

== Gallery ==
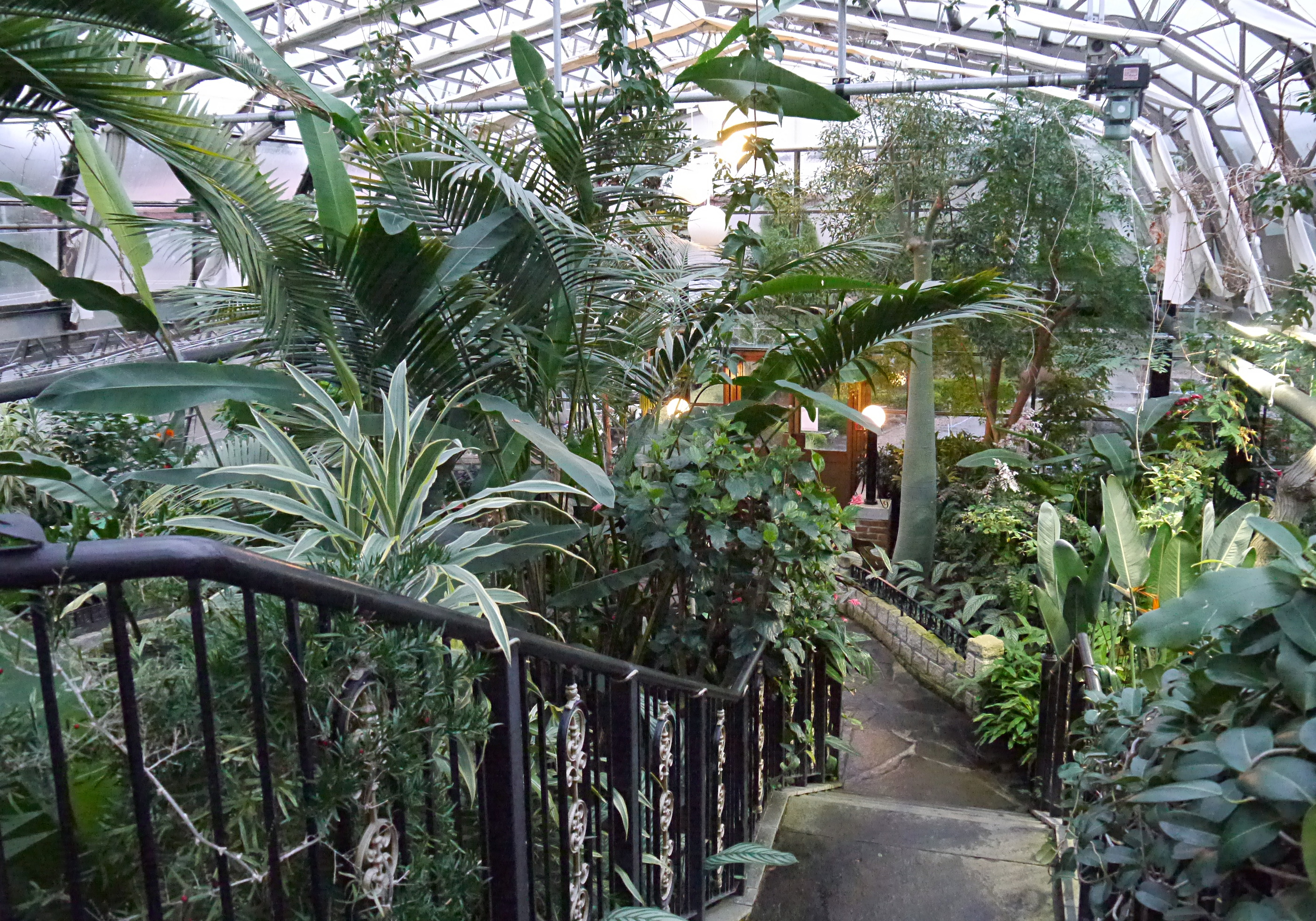
The Tropical House

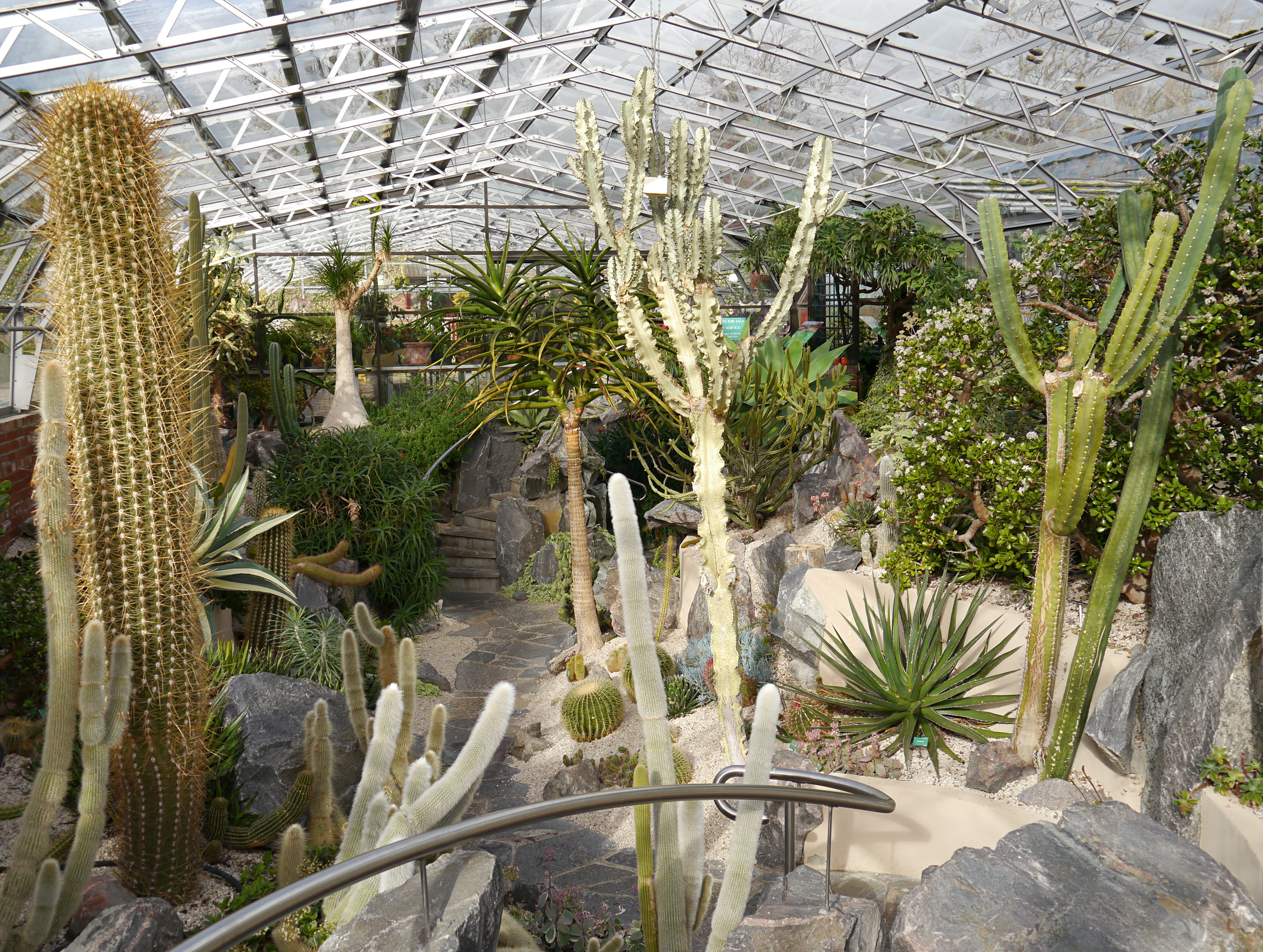
Cactus House

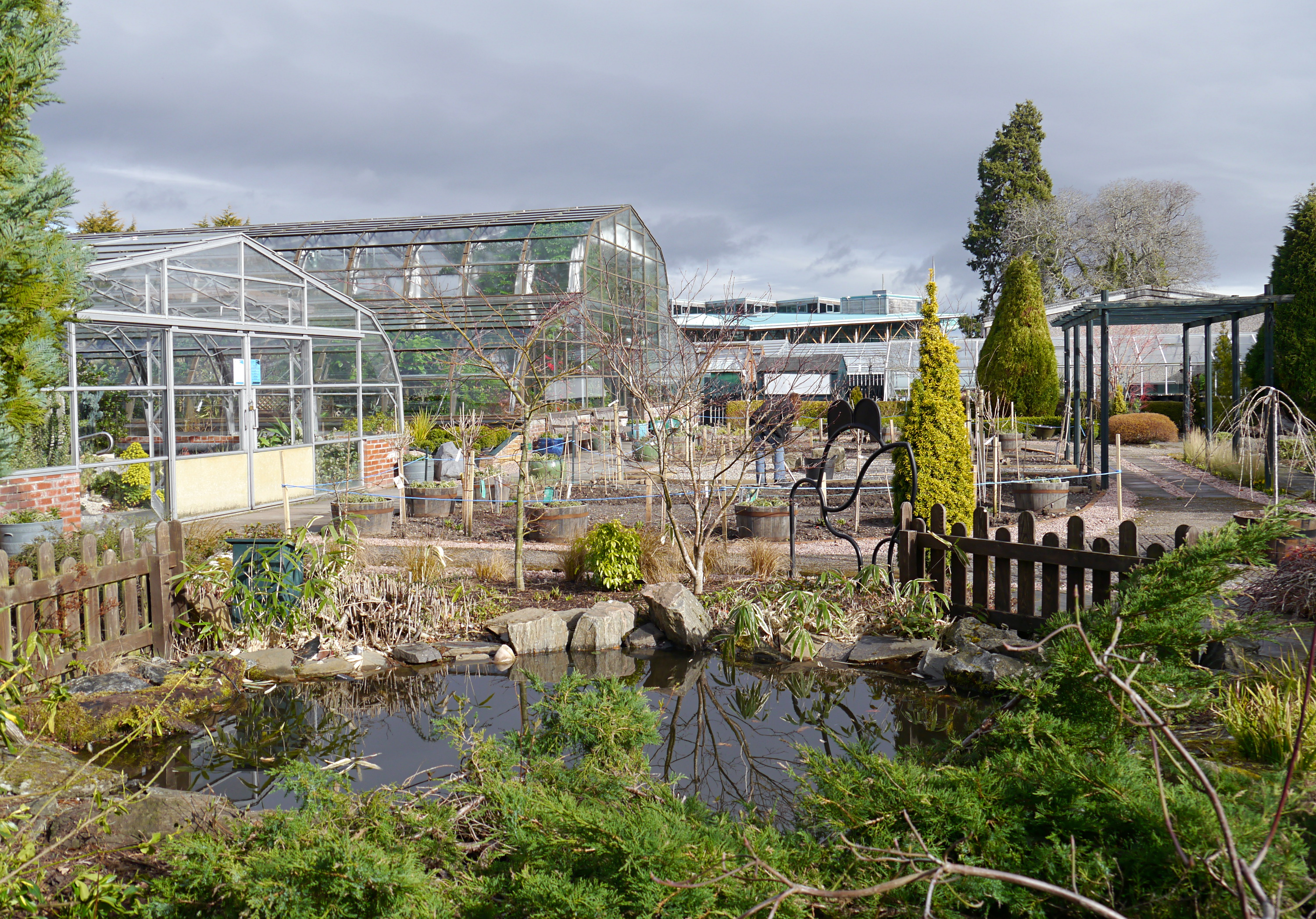
Pond and glass houses

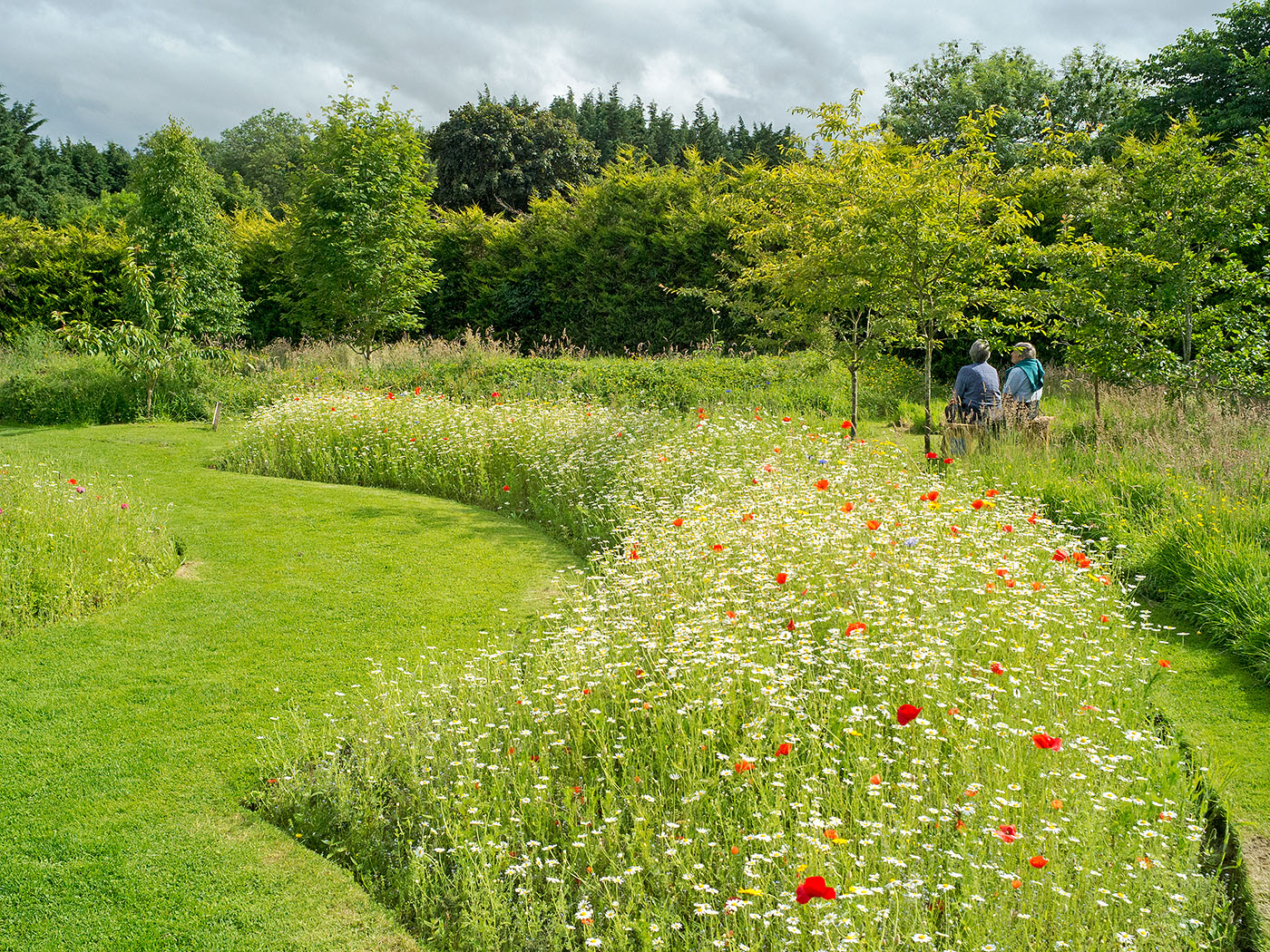
Meadow Garden

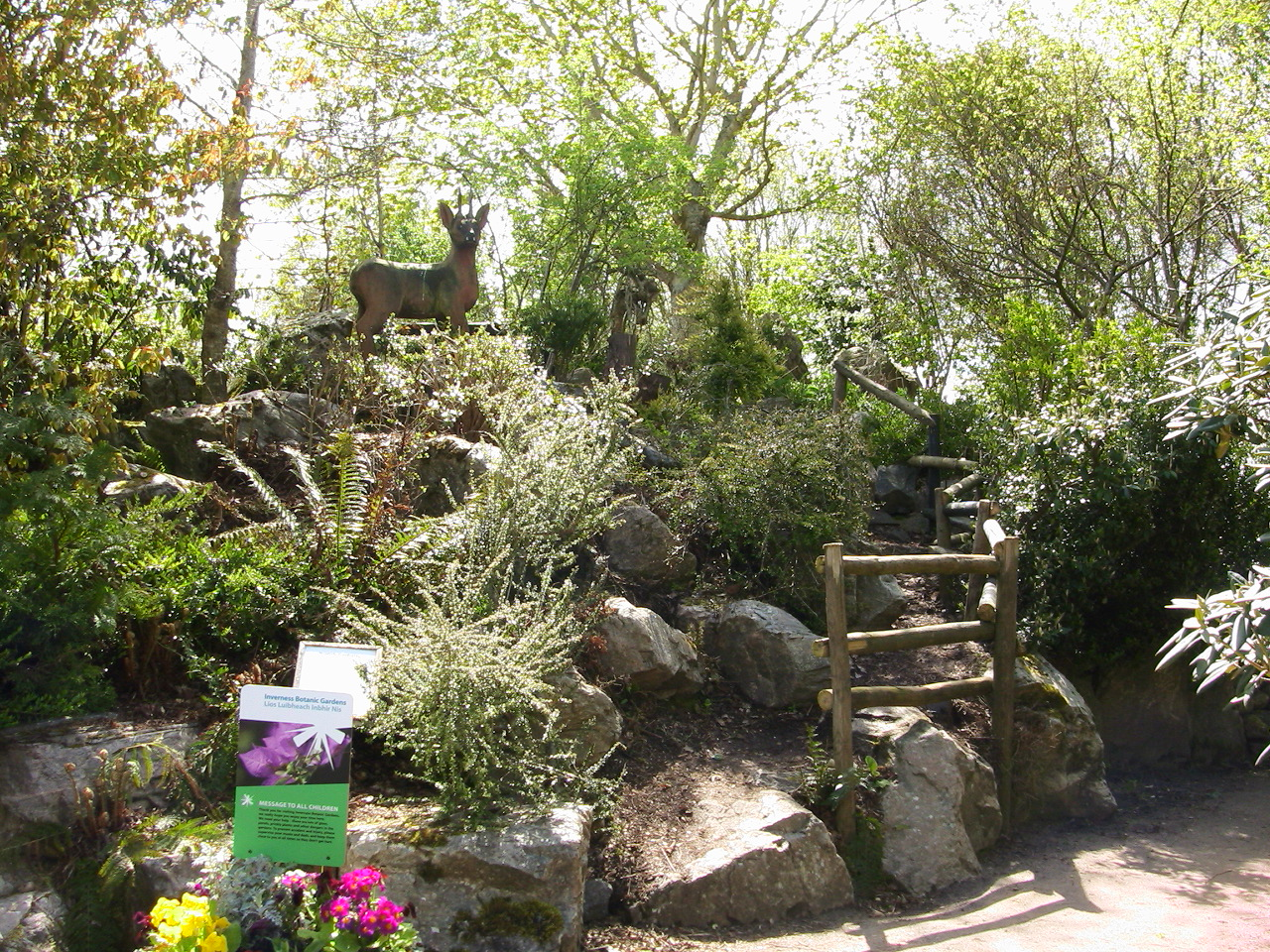
Woodland Garden

== See also ==
- List of gardens in Scotland
