= Logan Botanic Garden =

Scottish botanical garden with unusual climate

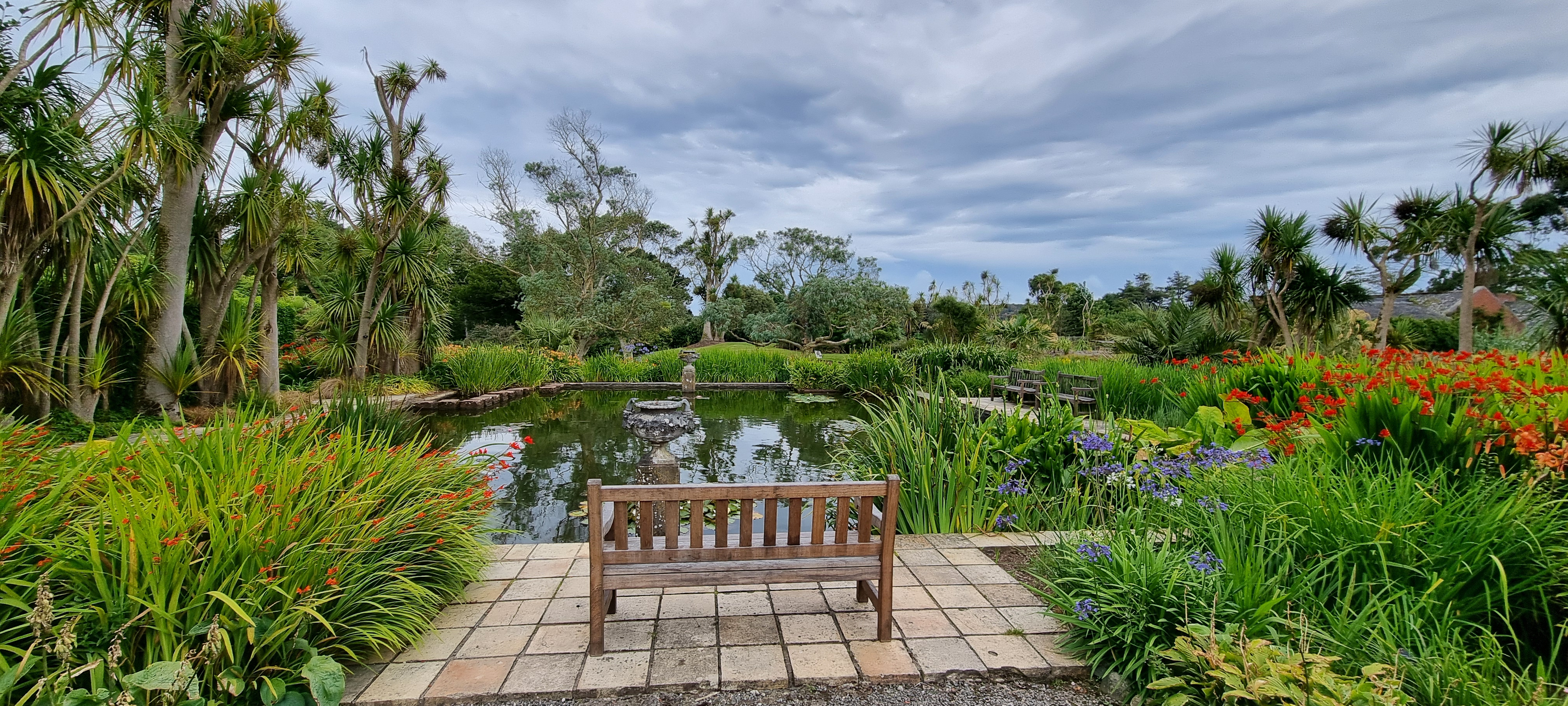
- The Central Walled Garden Pond at Logan
- Interactive map of Logan Botanic Garden
- Type: Botanical garden
- Location: Scotland
- Coordinates: 54°44′38″N 4°57′25″W
- Designation: Inventory of Gardens and Designed Landscapes in Scotland: GDL00267
- Website: Logan Botanic Garden

Designations

Inventory of Gardens and Designed Landscapes in Scotland
- Official name: Logan Botanic Garden
- Designated: 30 June 1987
- Reference no.: GDL00267

Logan Botanic Garden is a botanical garden near Port Logan on the Rhins of Galloway, at the south-western tip of Scotland. It is operated as part of the Royal Botanic Garden Edinburgh's Living Collection. It has been described as "Scotland's most exotic garden."

The garden adjoins the Logan Estate and Category A-listed House, which remain in private ownership.

== History ==
The Botanic Garden was established in 1869 and was gifted to Royal Botanic Garden Edinburgh in 1969. The gardens were built around the ruins of Balzieland Castle.

A new glasshouse was built at Logan in 2014. The building was designed as a Victorian architecture conservatory. It is the first public glasshouse in the UK that is entirely heated by energy sources that are renewable/green. These include solar panels and air-source heat pumps that maintain a temperature of 18 °C for the plant collection inside the glasshouse.

In July 2019, the garden celebrated 50 years since becoming part of the Royal Botanic Garden Edinburgh.

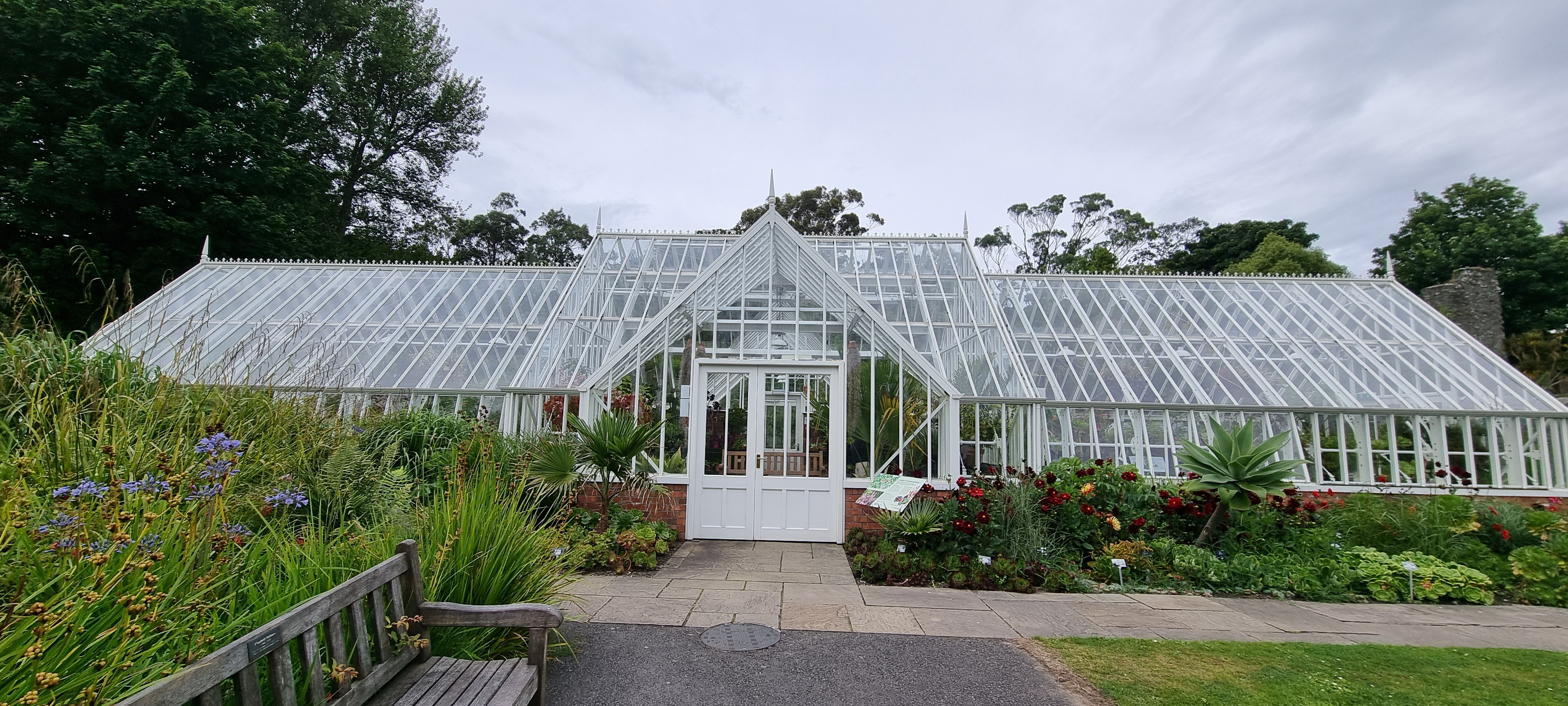
The Greenhouse seen in 2024 was built in 2019, utilising renewable energy to heat the building

In February 2021, the garden was badly affected by severe flooding.

The Botanic Garden's curator Richard Baines died on the 25th October 2026 after being killed by a falling tree during Storm Boelo while walking at Mid Kelton near Castle Douglas in Dumfries and Galloway.

== Location ==
The area has a mild climate, with mild winters, due to the influence of the North Atlantic Current and the Gulf Stream. The combination of this, acidic soils and the sheltered aspect of the gardens enables plants to be cultivated which would not normally survive outdoors in Scotland, with species from as far away as Chile, Vietnam, Australia and New Zealand all thriving in Logan's borders. Features of Logan include a sizeable Walled Garden complete with formal fish pond, an eco-Conservatory housing a variety of South African plants, Tasmanian Creek area, and Discovery Centre which houses various exhibitions throughout the seasons.

== Collections ==
Logan Botanic Garden has some 2,500 species in total and 120 species that are threatened with extinction. The road approach to the garden is notable for its mature collection of Trachycarpus fortunei (Chusan Palms) that line the road as an avenue.

The garden is also home to Plant Heritage's National Plant Collections of Gunnera, Griselinia and Leptospermum. It also has a significant collection of palm trees and tree ferns, most of which are typically found in sub-tropical gardens. These include Dicksonia antarctica and Cordyline australis dating to the 1870s.

The garden has a collection of Wollemia, unusual in Europe, being conserved and grown from Australian Botanic Garden Mount Annan.

The garden is home to several Rhododendron species including the Rhododendron kanehirai which is extinct in the wild. The garden also has a collection of Rhododendrons of the subsection Maddenia which are able to grow outdoors in Scotland at Logan due to the relatively mild climate of the area.

The garden has a Puya alpestris plant donated by the Royal Botanic Gardens, Kew in 2013. In July 2024, the flowers, which take up to ten years to form, bloomed over two weeks.

The garden has a collection of plants from Vietnam and has also been actively involved in botanical missions to the country, collecting research data and seeds.

Collections of Logan Botanic Garden
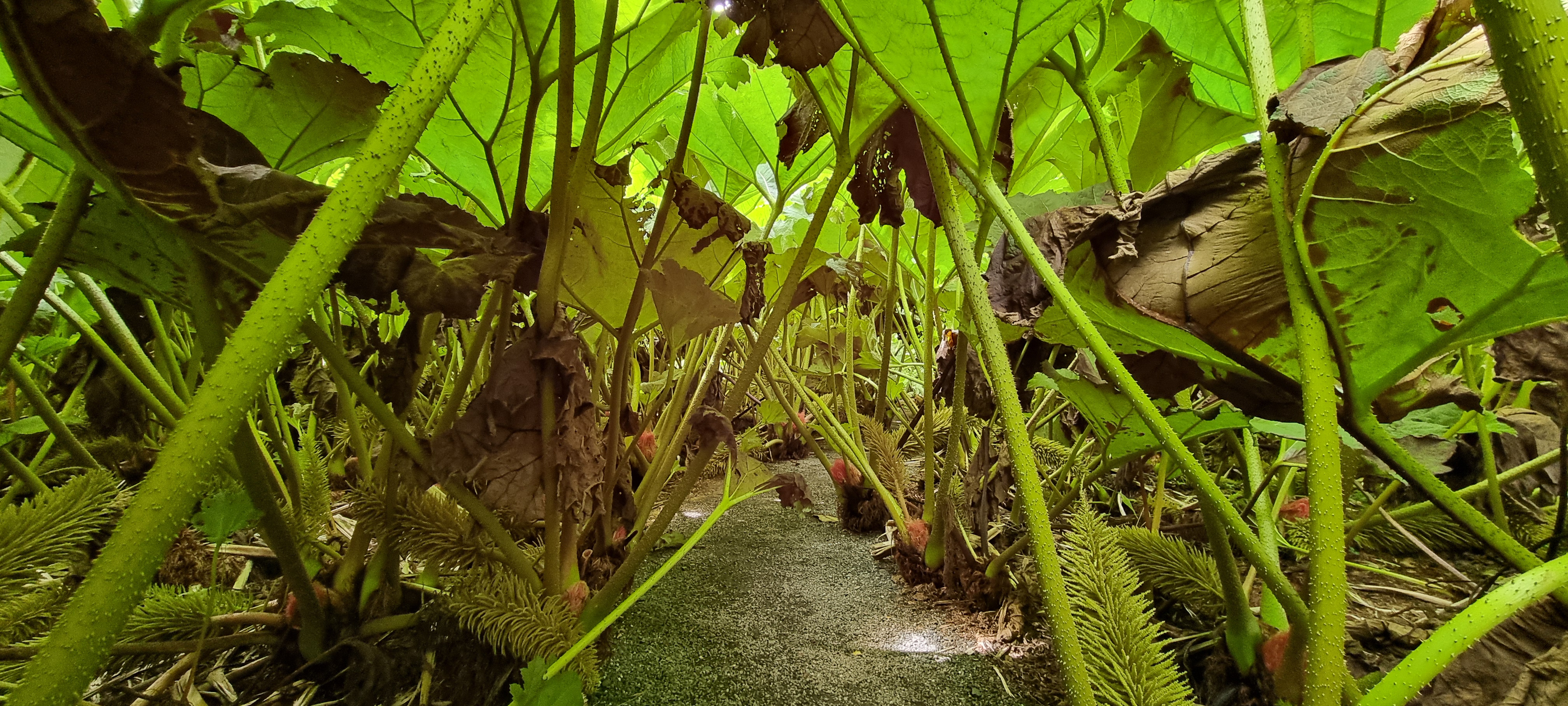
Extensive and large Gunnera manicata

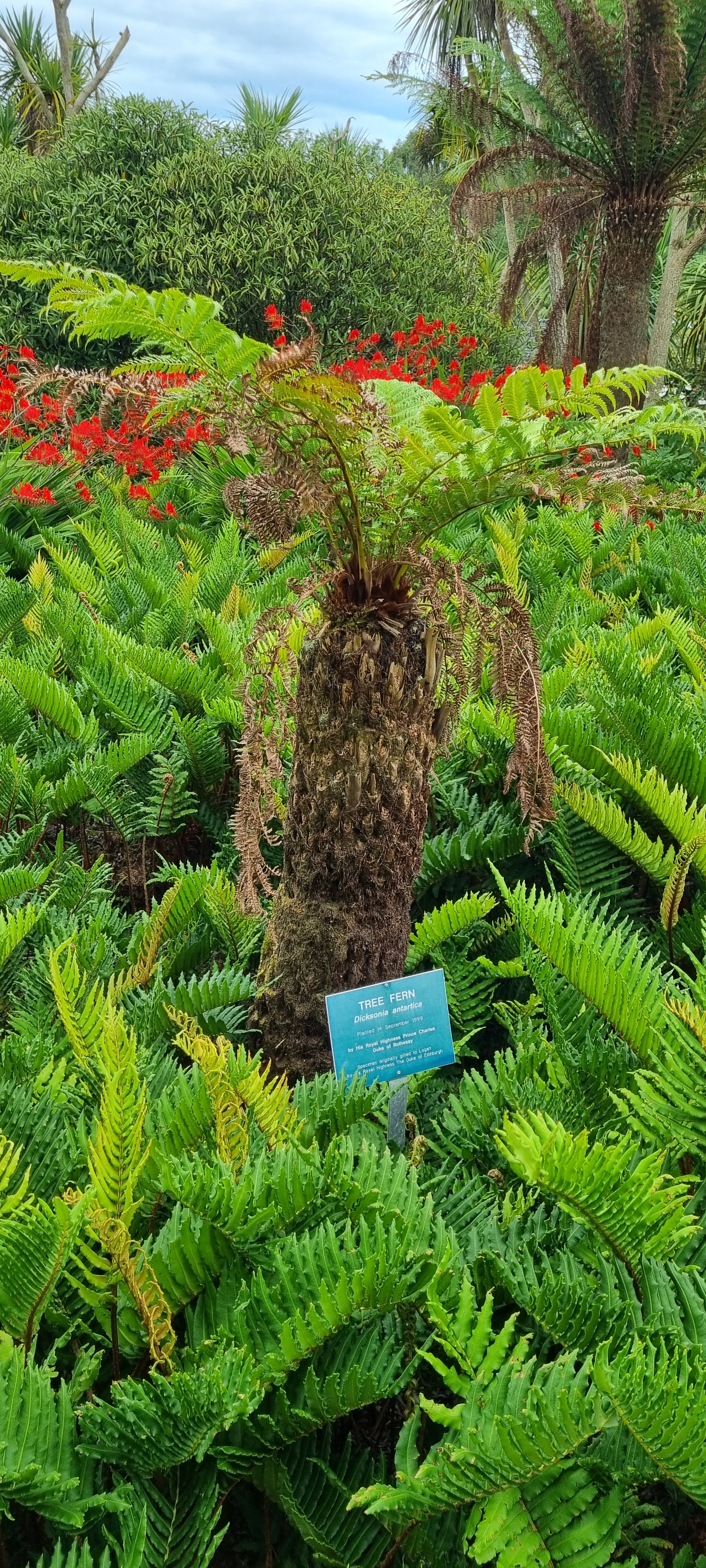
Dicksonia antarctica planted by Charles III in 1999 (then Duke of Rothesay)

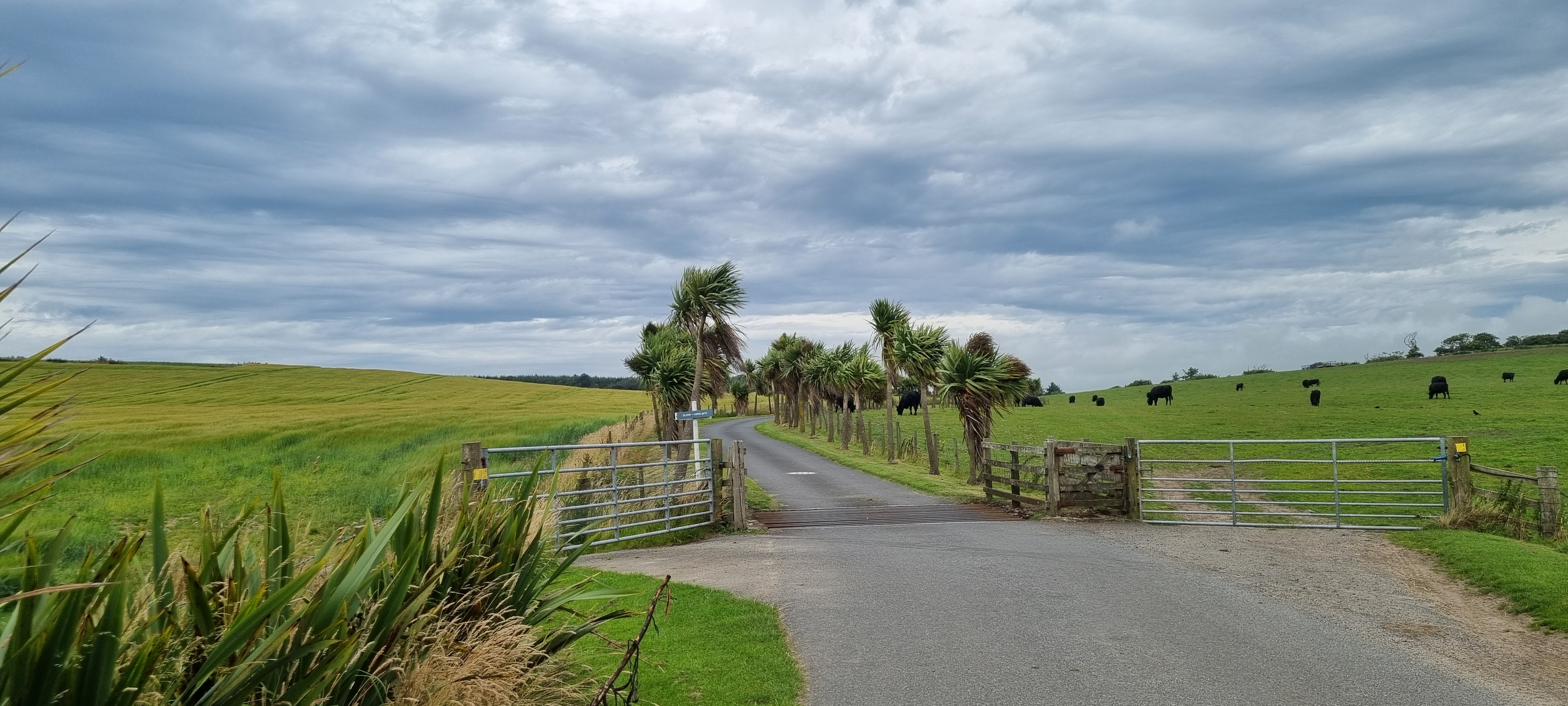
Entrance to garden and Cordyline australis (Cabbage tree) avenue

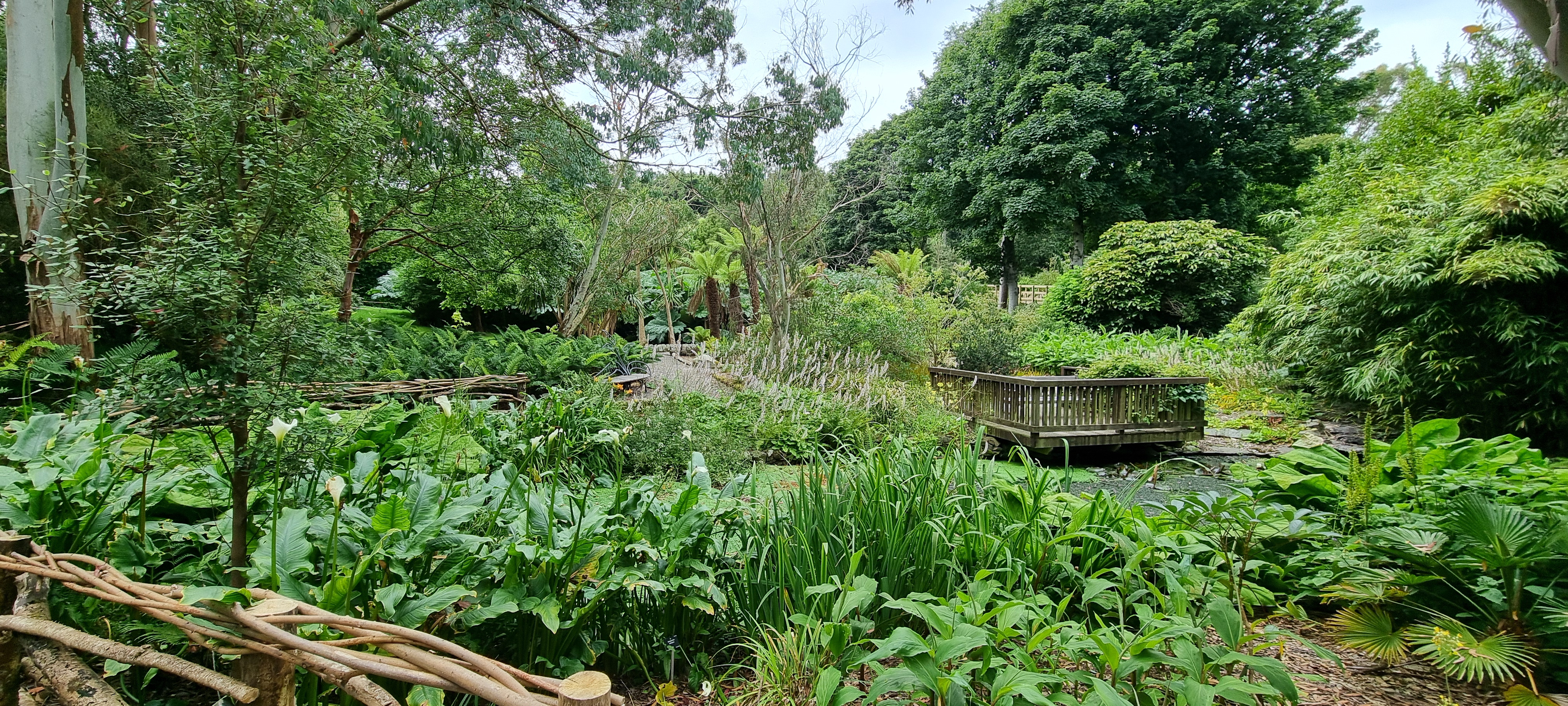
Pond with South American plants

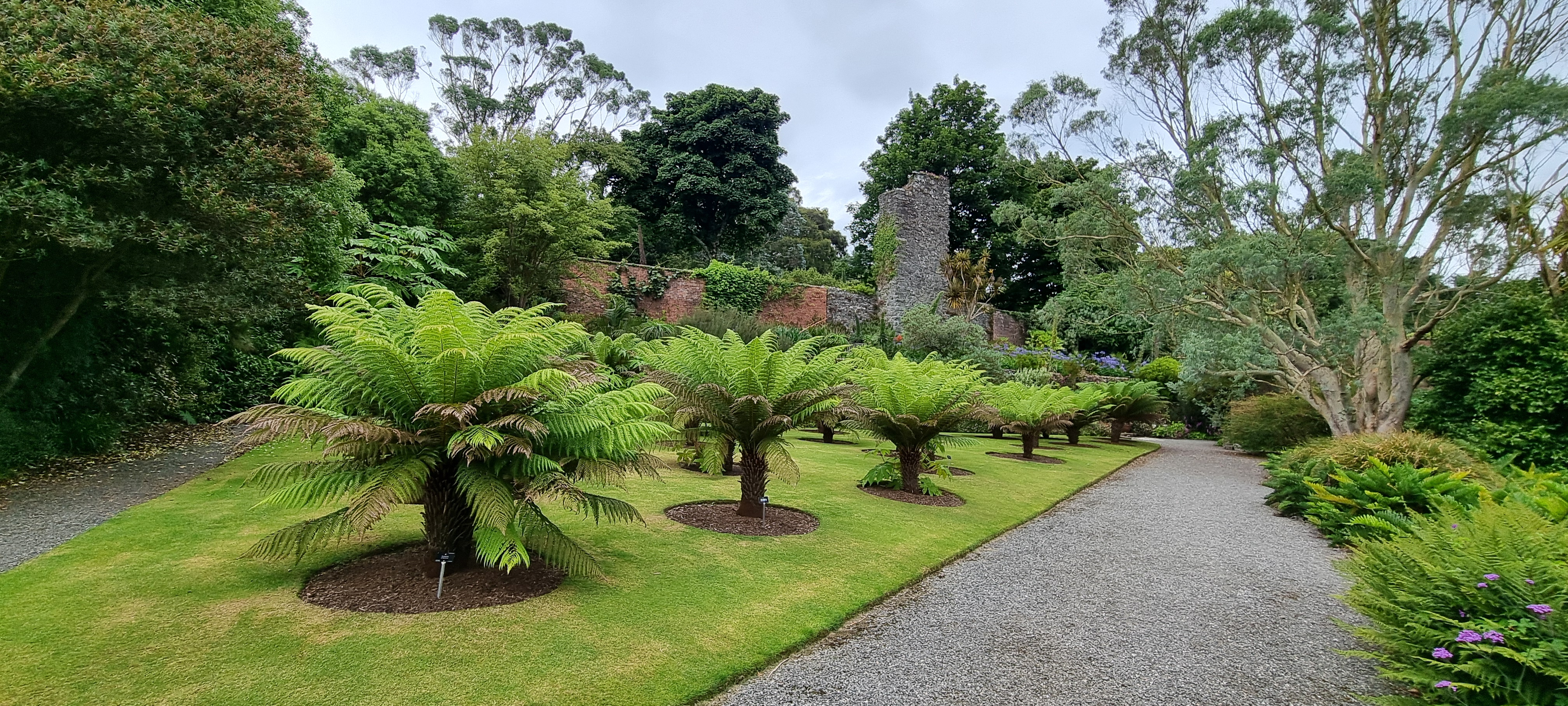
Tree ferns and the ruined remains of the Castle Balzieland

== See also ==
- List of gardens in Scotland
