= Cowbridge Physic Garden =

Herb garden in Vale of Glamorgan, South Wales

- Gardd Berlysiau'r Bont-Faen
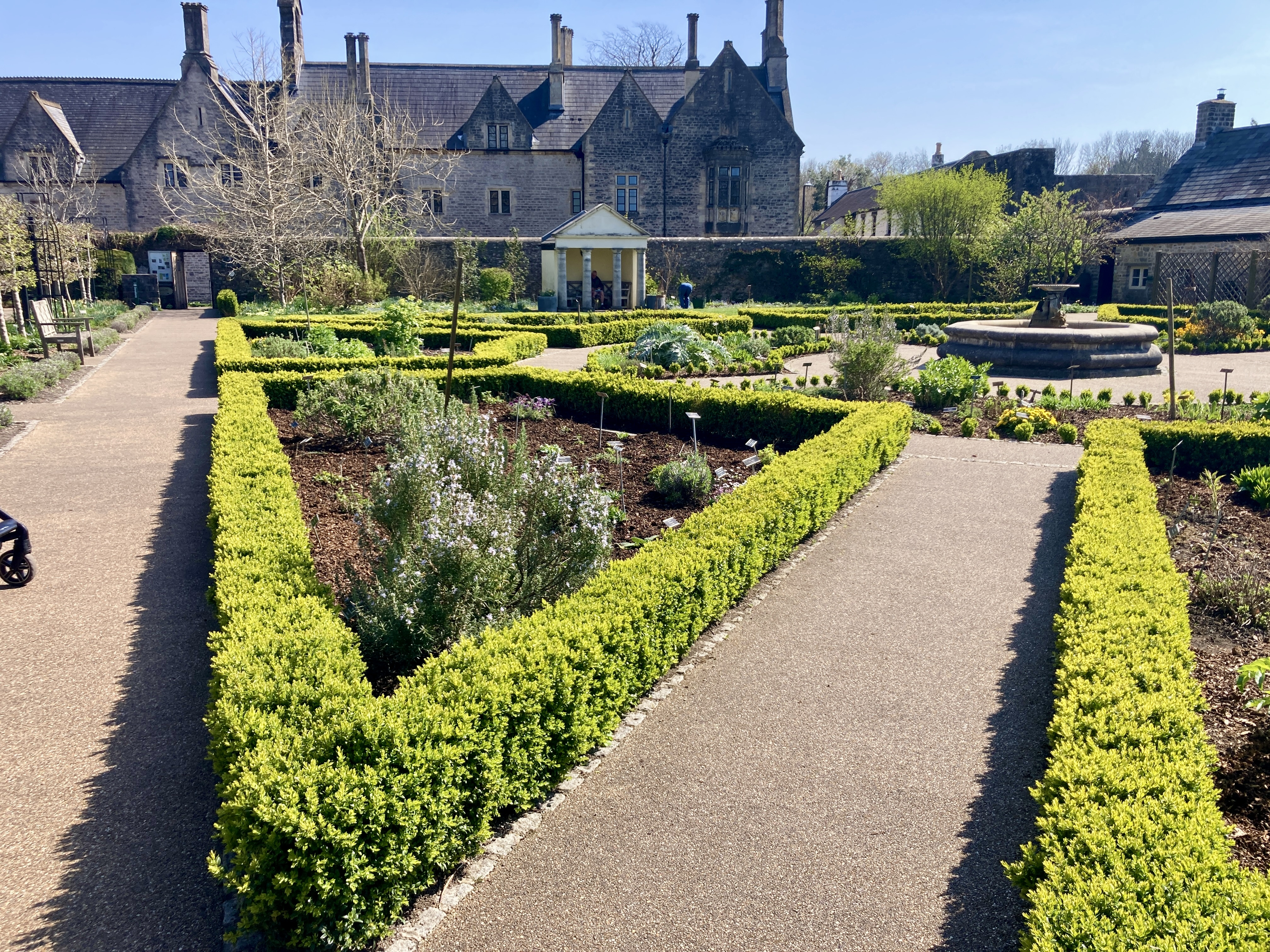
- Cowbridge Physic Garden in spring

- Location within Wales
- Interactive map of Cowbridge Physic Garden
- Location: Cowbridge, Wales
- OS grid: SS 99316 74604
- Coordinates: 51°27′41″N 3°27′02″W
- Opening: June 26, 2008
- Designer: Anthony Jellard Associates
- Administrator: Cowbridge Physic Garden Trust Limited
- Website: www.cowbridgephysicgarden.org.uk

The Cowbridge Physic Garden is located in Cowbridge, Vale of Glamorgan in South Wales. The 0.5 acres (0.20 ha) physic garden was created by the Welsh Historic Gardens Trust in 2004, and was opened in June 2008 by Camilla, Duchess of Cornwall. who is its patron. Surrounded by high stone walls, parts of which date to the 13th century, the physic garden is situated within a former 18th century formal garden which belonged to the Edmondes family of Old Hall. The garden was designed to replicate the styles of its 18th century predecessor, and only plants found in Britain before 1800 are included in the garden.
