= University of Dundee Botanic Garden =

Coordinates: 56.4555°N 3.0213°W

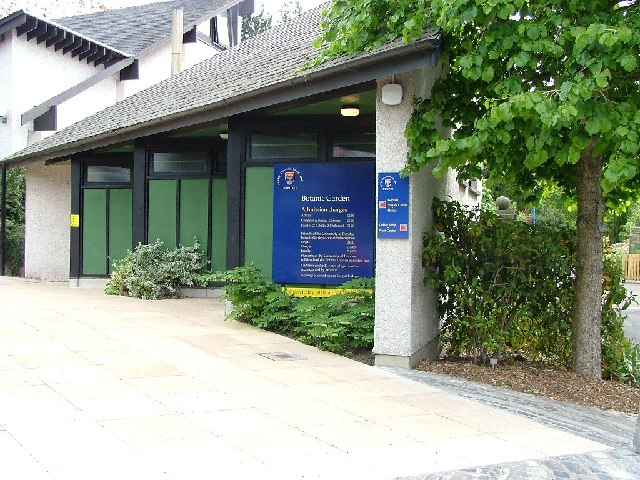
The Botanic Garden in 2004.

The University of Dundee Botanic Garden is a botanical garden in the West End of the city of Dundee, Scotland. The gardens are kept and funded entirely by the University of Dundee.

== History ==
Plans for a Botanic Garden in Dundee were first advanced by Professor Patrick Geddes in 1906, but were not acted upon at that point. This scheme would have seen the gardens developed between the Perth Road and Magdalen Green. Geddes was then Professor of Botany at University College, Dundee, and was responsible for laying out the grounds of its quadrangle (now known as the Geddes Quadrangle) in order that they could be used for teaching purposes. Another Geddes proposal in 1909 failed to be supported by University College. A further scheme suggested by Geddes in 1909 failed to gain support from the University College authorities.

Plans for a garden at the university were again mooted in the 1960s, but were rejected on grounds of cost. It was in 1970 that James Drever, Vice-Chancellor of the university, seriously considered the proposal and moved towards its foundation. The first appointed curator, Edward Kemp, brought a wealth of knowledge to the post, having formerly been curator at the Royal Botanic Garden Edinburgh.

== Curators ==
There have been, to date, four curators of the gardens:

- Edward Kemp (1971–1980)
- Les Bissett (1980–1998)
- Alasdair Hood (1998–2018)
- Kevin Frediani (2019–present)

== Entry ==
The garden is open daily from 10am until 4.30pm (March–October) or 3.30pm (November–February). A modest admission fee is charged, although entry is free for staff and matriculated students of the university. On Christmas Day, Boxing Day and the first two days of January, the gardens are closed.

== Friends ==
The Friends of Dundee University Botanic Garden is a charitable and voluntary society set up in 1982 to support the garden's development, raise funds and promote the garden's activities. In 2007 and 2008 the Friends led the campaign against plans to close the garden.
