= Little Sparta =

Sculpture garden in South Lanarkshire, Scotland

Coordinates: 55°43′25.3″N 3°30′32.3″W

Designations

Inventory of Gardens and Designed Landscapes in Scotland
- Official name: Little Sparta (Stonypath)
- Designated: 1 July 1987
- Reference no.: GDL00265

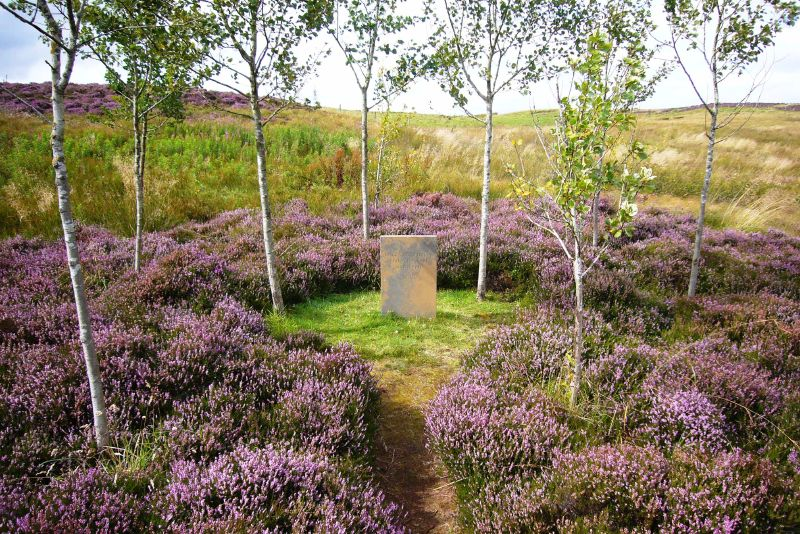
The "Grove above Lochan Eck" at Little Sparta

Little Sparta is a garden at Dunsyre in the Pentland Hills in South Lanarkshire, Scotland, created by artist and poet Ian Hamilton Finlay and his wife Sue Finlay, since 1966.

The five-acre (two-hectare) Arcadian garden includes concrete poetry in sculptural form, polemic, and philosophical aphorisms, together with sculptures and two temples. Altogether it includes over 275 artworks by the artist, created in collaboration with numerous craftsmen and women.

== History ==
The garden was first established in 1966 and was originally named Stonypath. Finlay lived there until shortly before his death in 2006. Finlay chose the name "Little Sparta" in 1983, in response to Edinburgh's nickname, the "Athens of the North", and playing on the historical rivalry between the Ancient Greek cities Athens and Sparta. Little Sparta survived numerous disputes, or "Wars" as Finlay termed them, regarding the rating and status of the Garden Temple; including tax disputes and government seizures. The wars are documented in the papers of Graeme Moore, landscape artist who worked with Finlay, held by the University of Pennsylvania's Kislak Center for Special Collections, Rare Books and Manuscripts.

Over their 23-year collaboration Ian Hamilton Finlay and Sue Finlay established Little Sparta as an internationally renowned composition, a combination of avant-garden experiment, Scottish wit and whimsy and the English landscape garden tradition. It comprised the front garden, the most intimate space, with many examples of Finlay's ‘garden poems’; a woodland garden extending around a small pool; and a series of paths, areas and sculptures in the wilder hillside landscape. Finlay conceived the garden as composed around inter-connected pools, burns and a small loch, Lochan Eck.

Finlay later extended the garden in the 1990s, creating a small English Parkland in the former paddock. A walled garden, ‘Hortus Conclusus’, was added after his death. These areas were created in collaboration with Pia Simig and Ralph Irving.

== Concepts ==
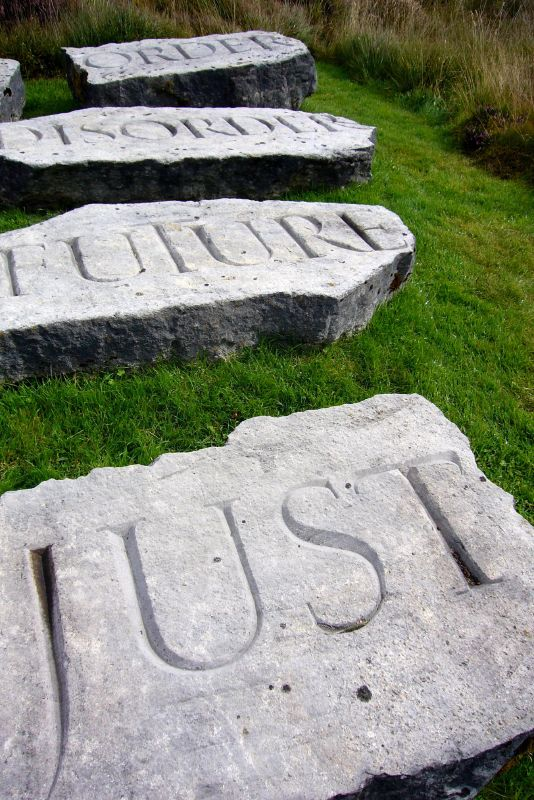
"The present order is the disorder of the future (St Just)" inscribed at Little Sparta

The key concept Ian established at Little Sparta was that of the ‘garden poem', sited within an ‘area’. Finlay defined the relationship between these poem-objects and their surroundings: "Usually each area gets a small artefact, which reigns like a small deity or spirit of place. My understanding is that the work is the whole composition – the artefact in its context. The work is not an isolated object, but an object with flowers, plants, trees, water and so on".

Sue Finlay, who undertook the majority of the planting and cultivation, describes the generosity of this creative process in her memoir The Planting of a Hillside Garden: “The learning process. The love involved in this process. That loving absorption – the day-to-day tending of the poems. Their immediate surrounding areas, whether paved, grassy or covered with plants, always needed a lot of individual attention in the summer".

== Preservation ==
The garden is now owned by the Little Sparta Trust, which plans to preserve the garden for the future by raising enough to pay for an ongoing maintenance fund. Trustees have included journalist Magnus Linklater and gallery owner Victoria Miro. The garden is open to the public on a limited basis.

== Reception ==
In December 2004, a poll of fifty Scottish artists, gallery directors and arts professionals, conducted by Scotland on Sunday, voted Little Sparta "the most important work of Scottish art". Art historian Sir Roy Strong has said of Little Sparta that it is "the only really original garden made in this country since 1945". James Campbell, writing in The Guardian, describes the garden as "one of the wonders of 20th-century art", and agrees with Hamilton Finlay's description of himself as the "avant-gardener".
