= Cruickshank Botanic Garden =

Botanic garden in Aberdeen, Scotland

Cruickshank Botanic Gardens
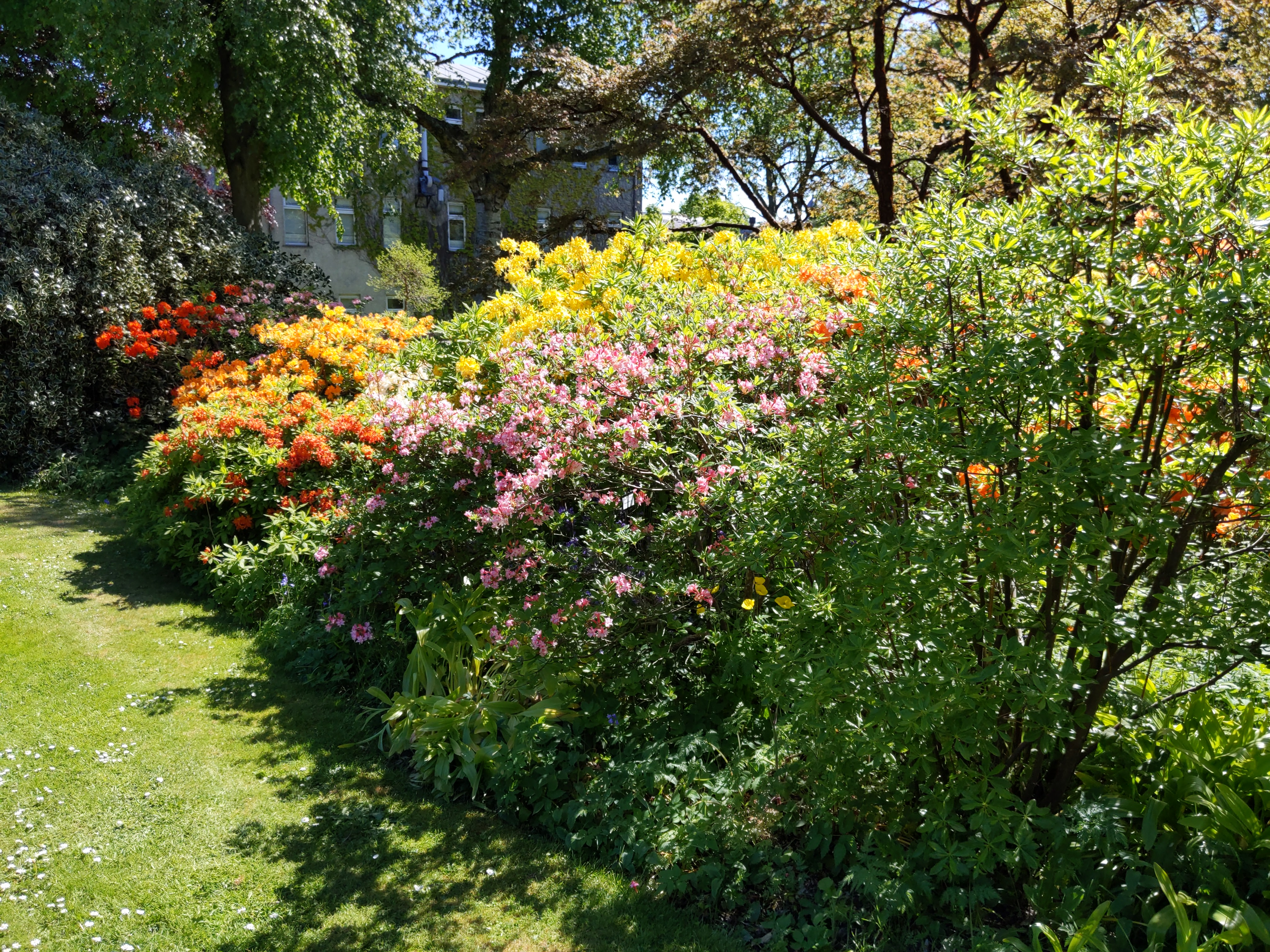
- Cruickshank Botanic Gardens
- Interactive map of Cruickshank Botanic Gardens
- Type: Trust owned gardens, open to public
- Location: Old Aberdeen, Aberdeen, Scotland
- Coordinates: 57°10′4″N 2°6′17″W
- Area: 11 acres (4.5 ha)
- Created: 1898
- Operator: University of Aberdeen and the Cruickshank Botanic Gardens Trust
- Open: Daily (locked at night)

The Cruickshank Botanic Garden is a botanical garden in Aberdeen, Scotland. It includes a Herbarium, and houses rare and endangered plants.

== History ==
The garden was built on land presented to the University of Aberdeen on 13 April 1898 by Anne Cruickshank to commemorate her brother Dr Alexander Cruickshank. Over time, more tracts of land were purchased, until the garden reached its present size. The 11 acre (45,000 m^{2}) garden is located in a low-lying and fairly sheltered area of Aberdeen, less than 1-mile (1.6 km) from the North Sea.

The Cruickshank Botanic Garden is partly owned and financed by the university and partly by the Cruickshank Botanic Garden Trust. The Friends of the Cruickshank Botanic Garden were formed in 1982 in order to promote and support the garden.

=== Present status ===
Although open to the public, the garden is extensively used for both teaching and research purposes. The Natural History Centre regularly guides school parties round the Garden, and the School of Biological Sciences of the University of Aberdeen holds a reception for graduands and their guests here each July. During the summer holidays, the Friends provide a bursary to allow an undergraduate student interested in botany to gain work experience in the gardens.

A plaque in the Cruickshank Botanic Garden commemorates Francis Masson, a Scottish botanist, gardener, and Kew Gardens’ first plant hunter.

== See also ==
- Green spaces and walkways in Aberdeen
