= Crarae =

Coordinates: 56.127281°N 5.241361°W

- Location within Argyll and Bute
- OS grid reference: NR 98928 97613
- Council area: Argyll and Bute
- Lieutenancy area: Argyll and Bute
- Country: Scotland
- Sovereign state: United Kingdom
- Post town: LOCHGILPHEAD
- Postcode district: PA32
- Police: Scotland
- Fire: Scottish
- Ambulance: Scottish
- UK Parliament: Argyll, Bute and South Lochaber
- Scottish Parliament: Argyll and Bute

Designations

Inventory of Gardens and Designed Landscapes in Scotland
- Official name: Crarae
- Designated: 30 June 1987
- Reference no.: GDL00118

Crarae is a settlement in Argyll and Bute, Scotland, on the shore of Loch Fyne. It lies on the A83, north of Lochgilphead.

== Crarae Gardens ==
The location is known for the Crarae Gardens, a Himalayan botanical garden created by Lady Grace Campbell, now run by the National Trust for Scotland. The garden begun in 1912 and was supported by the Campbell family until 2001, when financial troubles caused the garden to close, seeing it purchased by the National Trust and reopened a year later.
