= Farrells =

British architecture firm

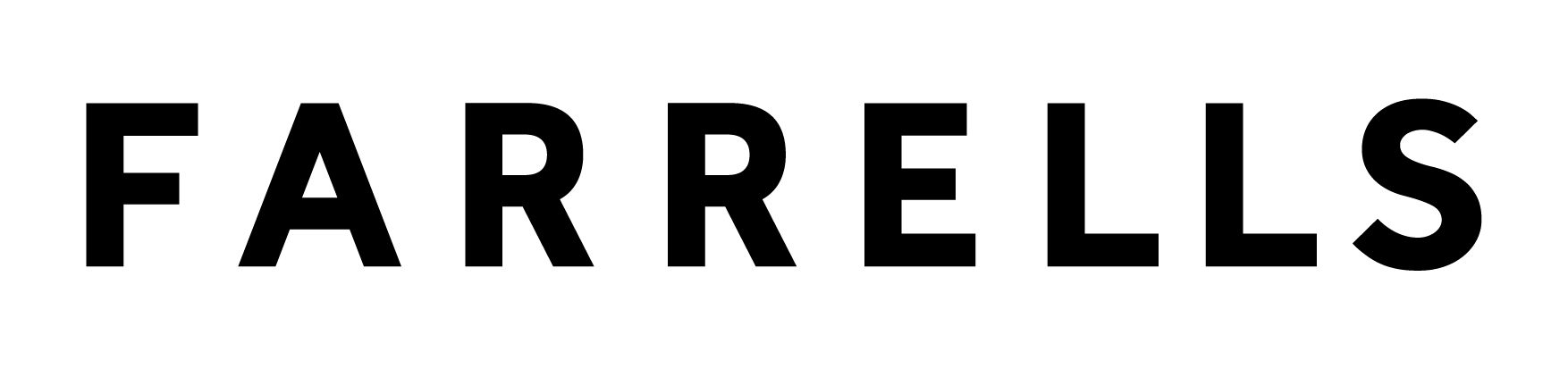
- Industry: Architecture and planning
- Founded: 1965; 61 years ago
- Founder: Sir Terry Farrell
- Area served: Worldwide
- Services: Architectural design, urban design, master planning, interior design, sustainable design, transportation planning
- Website: farrells.com

Farrells is an architecture and urban design firm founded by British architect and planner Sir Terry Farrell with offices in London, Manchester, Hong Kong, and Shanghai. The firm has won numerous awards for their characteristic mixed-use schemes, transit-oriented development, contextual urban placemaking, and cultural buildings.

== Origins ==
Terry Farrell began his professional career in 1961 at the architecture department of the London County Council, where he met fellow staff architect Nicholas Grimshaw. The two became close friends, and in 1965 they founded the Farrell/Grimshaw Partnership, sharing their office for some time with Archigram. They were also part of a "new wave" of British firms experimenting with high-tech architecture. During this period Farrell/Grimshaw produced several pioneering works of high-tech, flexible buildings such as the 125 Park Road housing cooperative (1970) and the Herman Miller factory in Bath (1976); both of which have since been awarded Grade II listing by English Heritage. Grimshaw left the firm in 1980 to found Grimshaw Architects, while Farrell continued to work from their Paddington Street office.

== Work ==
=== Growth in Britain ===
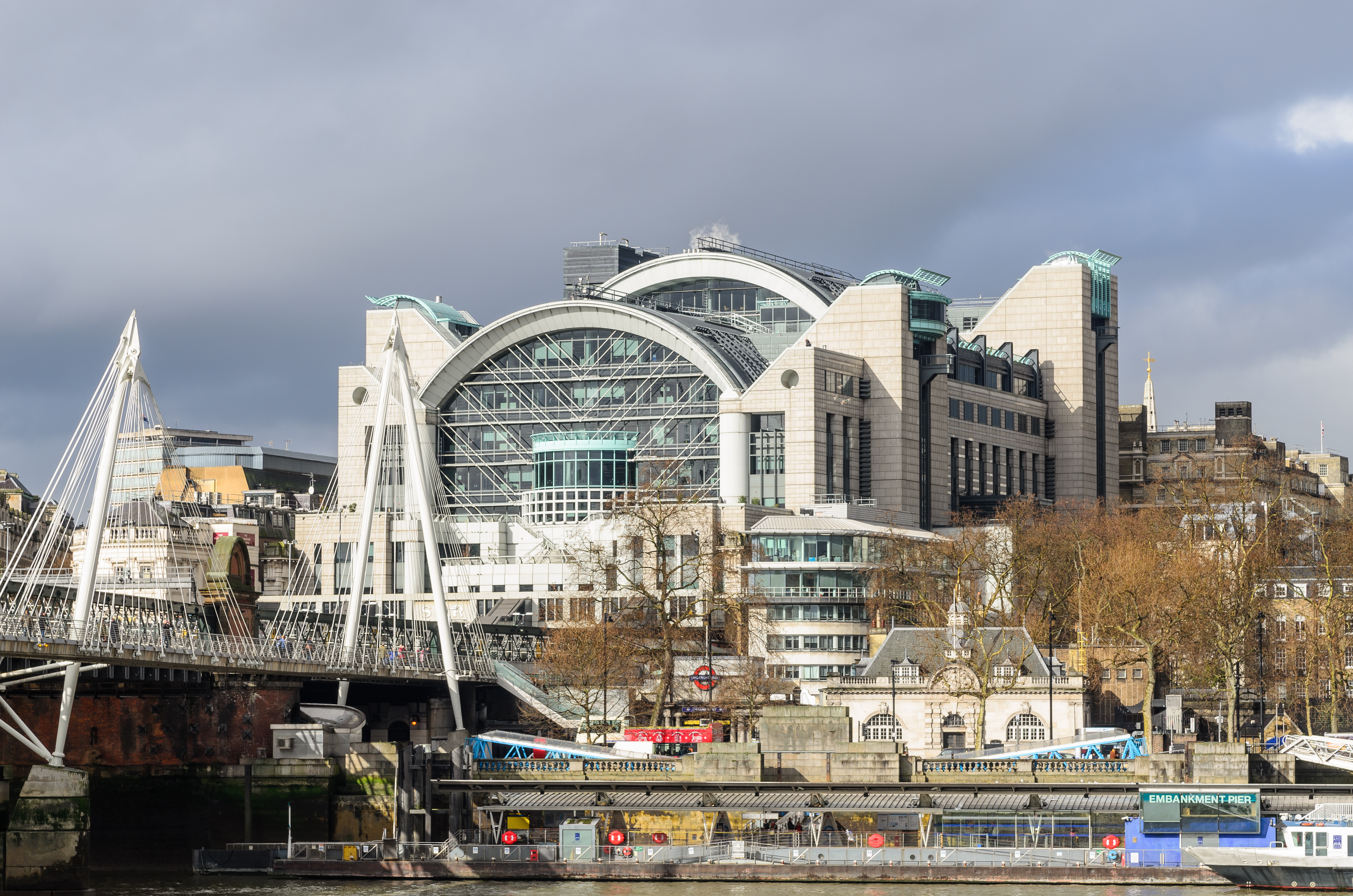
Embankment Place, the air-rights development over Charing Cross railway station (1990)

The newly christened Terry Farrell and Partners married high-tech architecture to Farrell's growing interest in postmodernism, building conversion, and sensitive urban design. London was brimming with outmoded industrial buildings, which Farrell preferred to retain and repurpose rather than demolish. The firm completed numerous renovations characterised as "friendly adaptation of existing buildings". Both the TV-am and Limehouse Studios schemes transformed derelict industrial sheds into broadcasting studios. In 1987 the firm moved from the ex-Farrell/Grimshaw office into a Marylebone building formerly home to an aero-tyre factory, which they renovated to become the Hatton Street Studios.

Large-scale new build commissions in London such as Embankment Place (1990), Alban Gate (1992), and Vauxhall Cross (1994) cemented Farrell's status as Britain's "premier postmodernist". Farrell dismissed the term, insisting that his primary concerns are not about style, but rather urban space and a rejection of the "clean sweep" approach of traditional modernism.

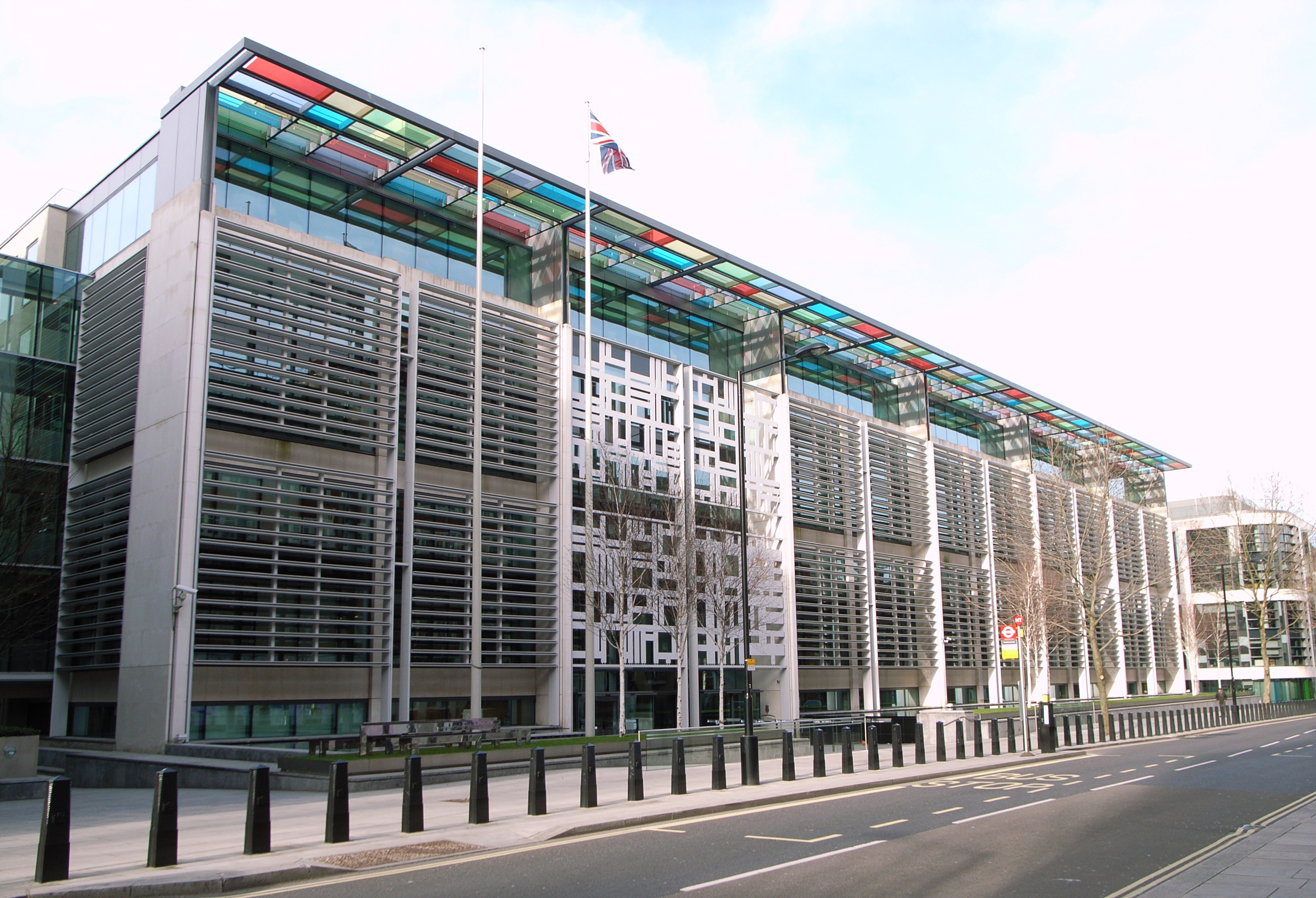
Home Office building, London (2005)

Small-scale urban regeneration and conservation work, such as the Comyn Ching Triangle scheme (1982–1990), bolstered the firm's reputation for contextual urban design. The company conducted numerous master plans over the subsequent decades, including many in the London area. In East London, the firm was appointed to plan various projects in the Docklands and Thames Gateway regions. They have also developed revitalisation schemes for urban quarters including Regent's Place, Greenwich Peninsula, the Chelsea Waterfront, and Convoys Wharf. In 2010, the firm was appointed master planner for the long-term redevelopment of an area of Earl's Court surrounding the now-closed Earls Court Exhibition Centre. Terry Farrell rejected "big architecture" the site, stating: "I don’t think this masterplan is about the buildings. That’s starting at the wrong end of the process. Issues of height and density aren’t starting points. You have instead to talk about things like the street and its width and what makes a good city."

At the 2013 invitation of Ed Vaizey, the Minister for Culture, Communications and Creative Industries, Farrells commenced the Farrell Review of Architecture and the Built Environment meant to offer expert guidance on the direction of British architecture. The firm assembled a team of leading experts in architecture and urban design and conducted an extensive consultation process. In 2014 the Farrell Review report was published, providing 60 recommendations to government. The report was well-received and government moved to place design higher on the agenda, starting by shifting the ministerial oversight of architecture from the Department of Culture, Media and Sport to the Department for Communities and Local Government, and by forming a new parliamentary select committee on the built environment.

=== Hong Kong expansion ===
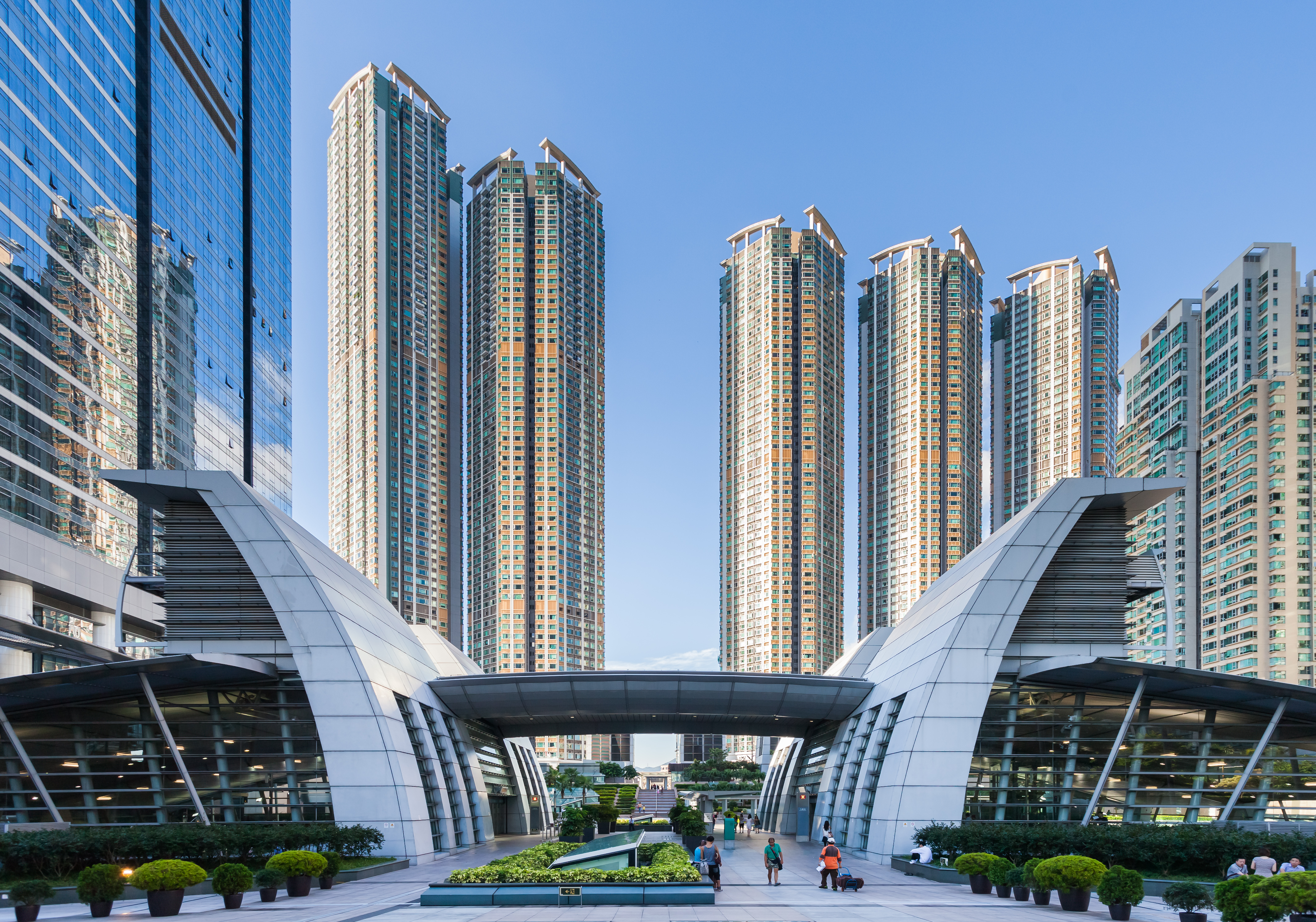
Kowloon station and the Union Square development (1998–2010)

The Hong Kong office, incorporated as TFP Farrells, was founded in 1991. It was set up when the firm won an international competition to design the new Peak Tower, which opened in 1997 and was later featured on Hong Kong's $20 banknotes. The firm then won a competition to design the British Council/Consulate-General complex in Admiralty. This commission, announced by Margaret Thatcher in 1988, held significance as Britain's lasting presence in Hong Kong following the 1997 transfer of sovereignty over Hong Kong.

TFP Farrells developed a strong reputation in urban transportation infrastructure beginning with the design for Kowloon station (opened 1998) and the associated Union Square master plan, one of the largest air-rights developments on earth which includes the tallest tower in Hong Kong, the International Commerce Centre. The Ground Transportation Centre at Incheon International Airport, Seoul (2001) serves five different rail systems and won several awards. The firm subsequently won commissions to design additional MTR stations in Hong Kong (namely Tsuen Wan West, Kennedy Town, To Kwa Wan, Sung Wong Toi) in addition to railway stations in Johannesburg (three Gautrain stations) and Singapore (Punggol station). In recent years the firm has expanded into Mainland China, opening a Shanghai branch office and completing two of Asia's largest railway stations: Beijing South (2008) and Guangzhou South (2010).

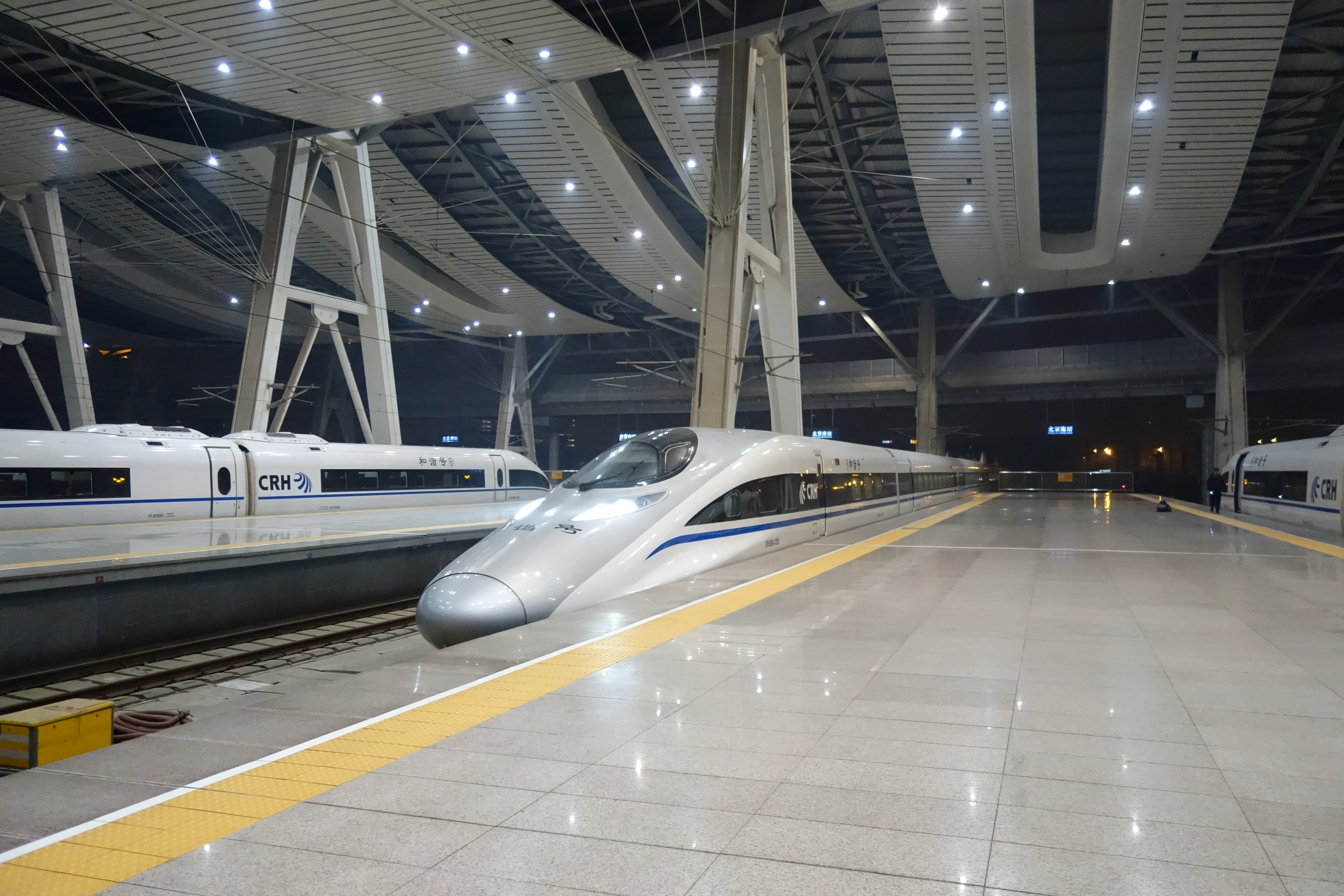
Beijing South railway station (2008)

In addition, the firm has designed numerous landmark skyscrapers in Asia. The KK100 tower in Shenzhen, completed 2011, is the tallest building ever realised by a British architect. The Vattanac Capital Tower (2014) is the tallest building in Cambodia. The 528-metre China Zun in the Beijing central business district will be the tallest building in the Chinese capital upon completion in 2018. In 2014, the firm won a competition to design the first six skyscrapers to be built in the Qianhai special economic zone, two of which topped out in 2015. In Jinan, Shandong, TFP Farrells is designing a 518-metre tall tower for Evergrande Group which will become one of China's tallest buildings upon completion. Though these Chinese skyscraper commissions represent a major shift in tempo from the firm's earlier work in the United Kingdom, the projects attempt to retain human-scale and pedestrian-oriented characteristics with an aim to achieving urban vibrancy.

The Hong Kong office has grown steadily over the past years and, despite handling all the firm's growth in the Asia-Pacific and Middle East regions, maintains a significant presence in local Hong Kong architecture. Working in partnership with Swiss architects Herzog & de Meuron, the firm was among six teams shortlisted for the competition to design the prominent M+ museum at the West Kowloon Cultural District. Their design won in 2013 and construction of the museum recently commenced. TFP Farrells has been retained by the MTR Corporation for numerous ongoing projects including station upgrades, the Sha Tin to Central Link, the Express Rail Link, and the West Island line. The Kennedy Town Swimming Pool, opened in stages between 2011 and 2016, is one of Hong Kong's most recognisable new public buildings, bearing a triangular form that has been likened to a futuristic spaceship.

== Notable projects ==
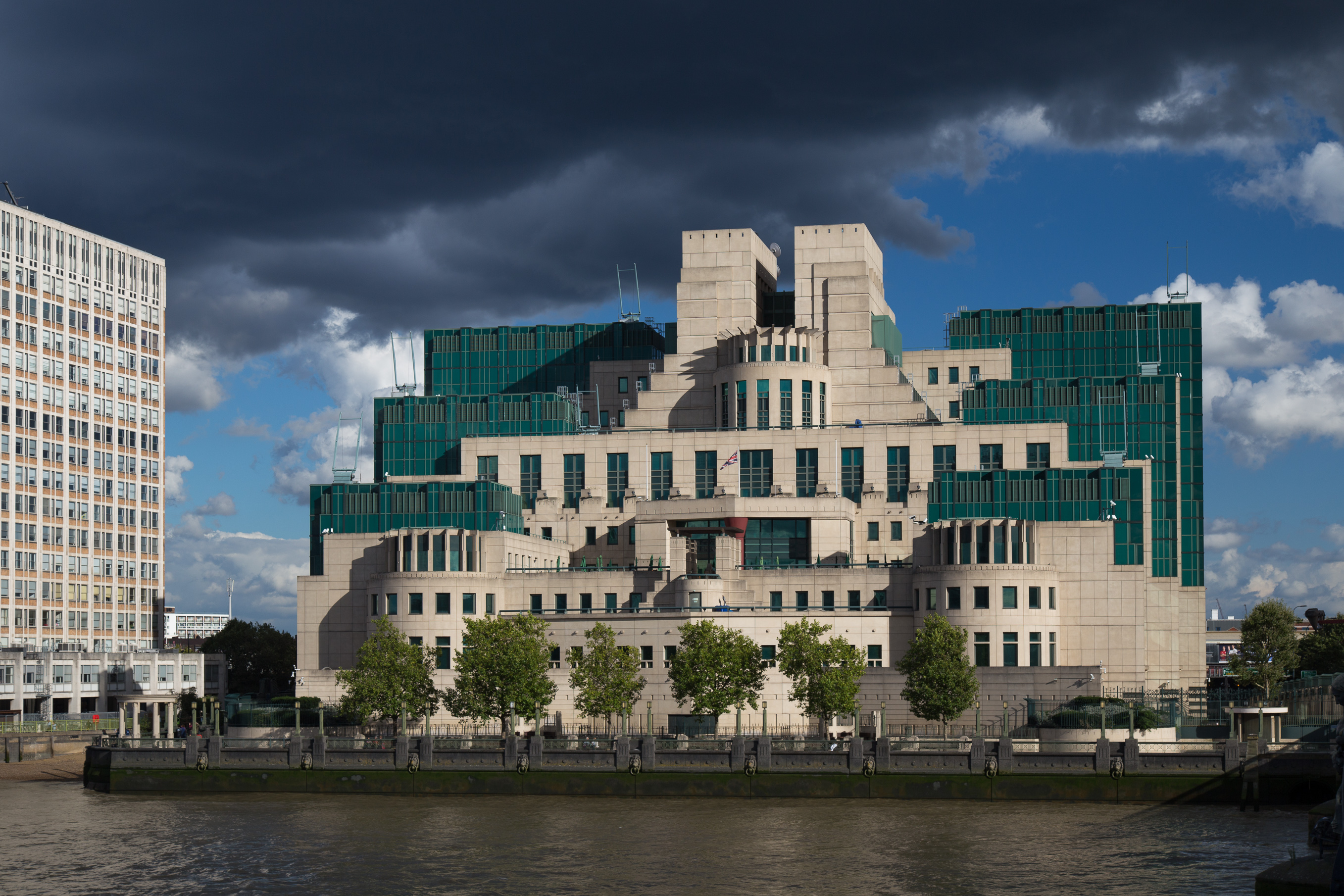
Vauxhall Cross, London (1994)

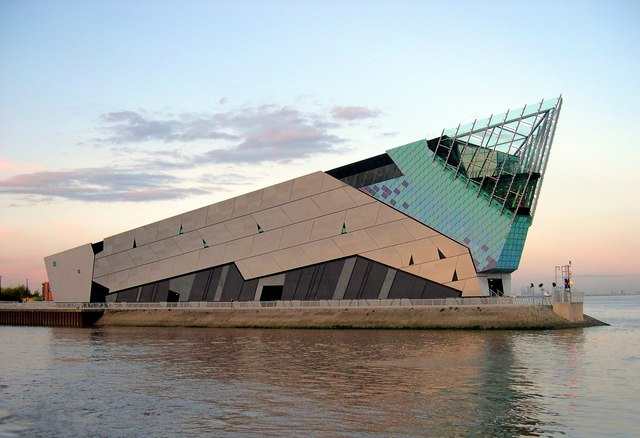
The Deep aquarium, Hull (2002)

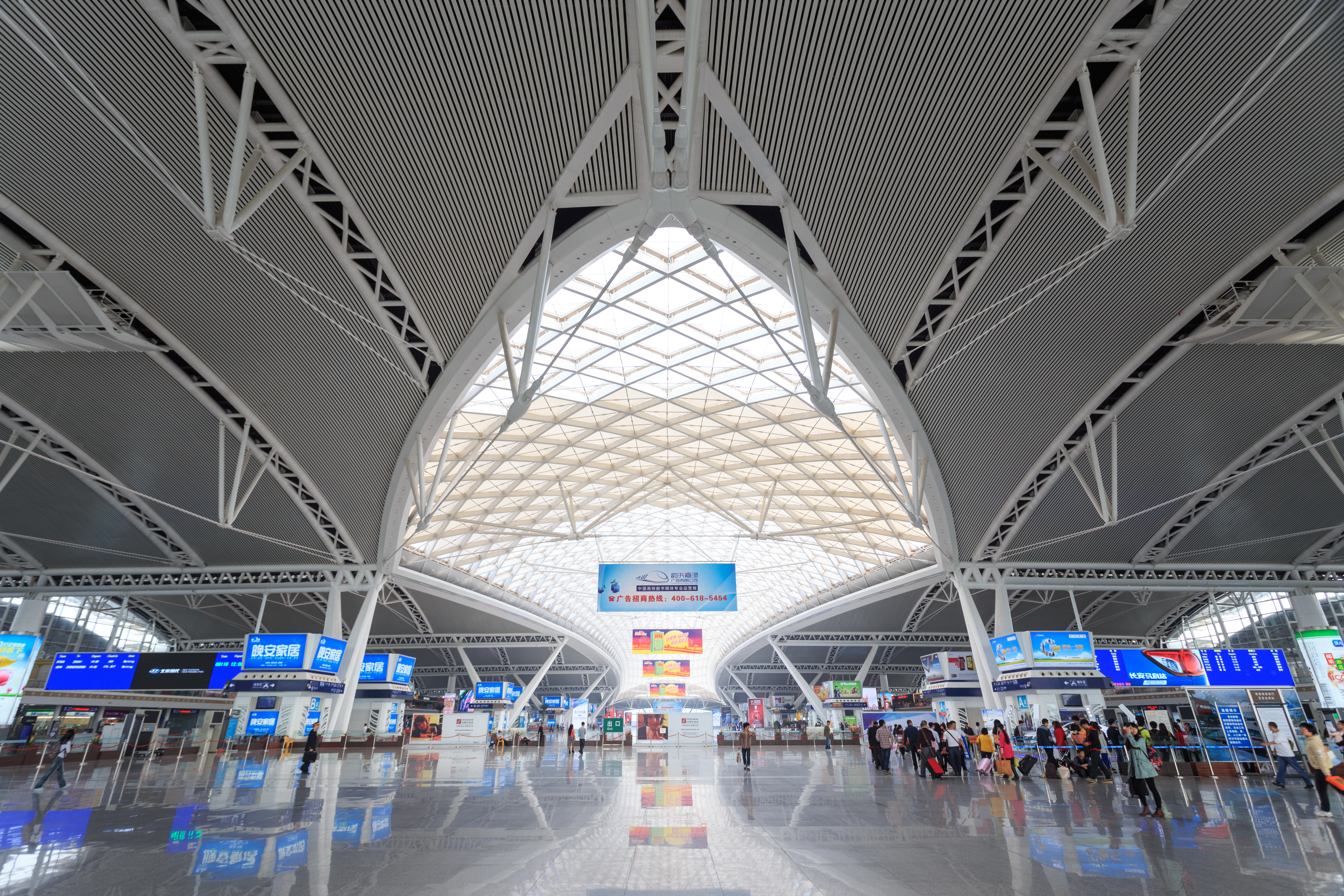
Guangzhou South railway station (2010)

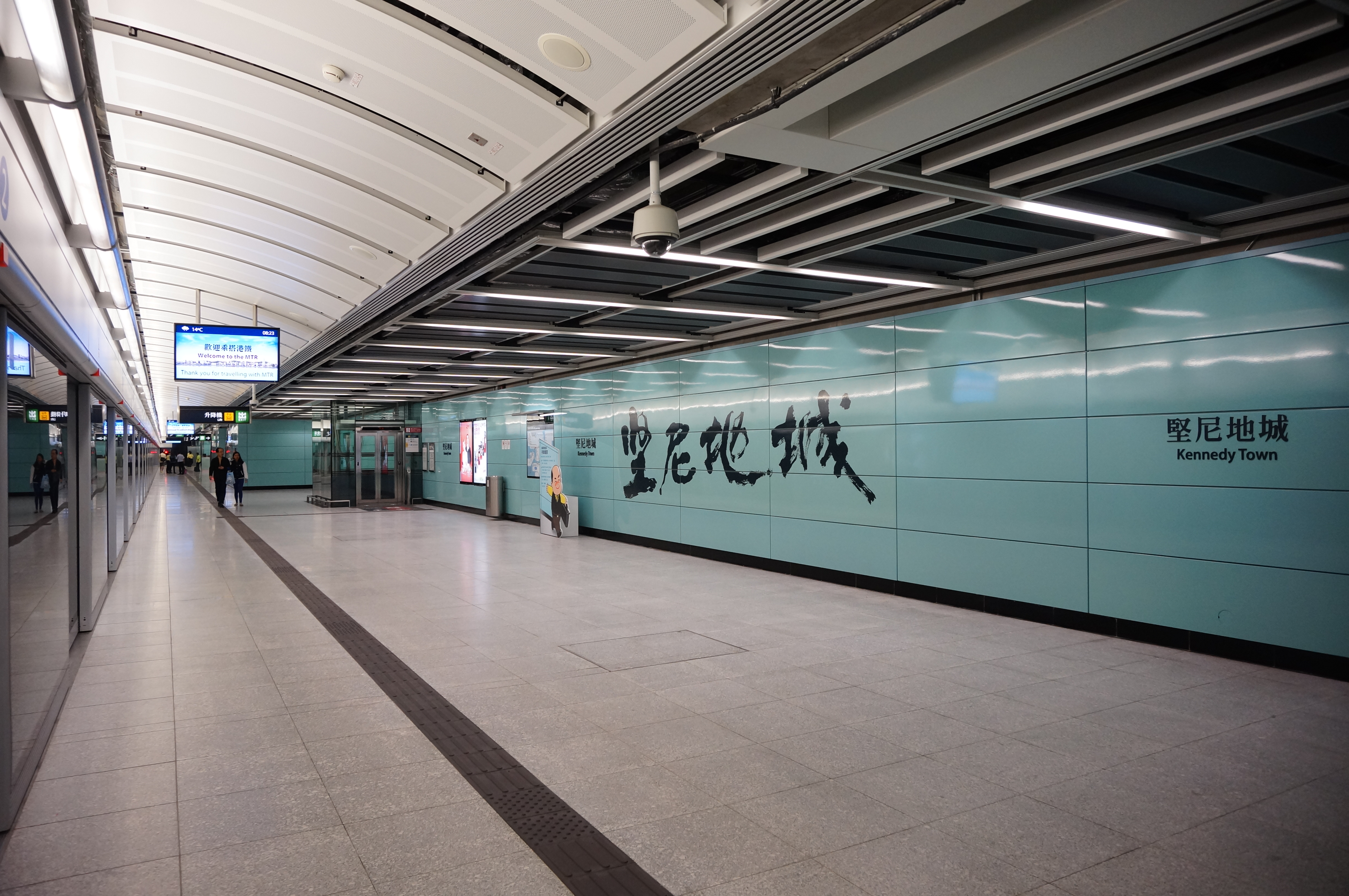
Kennedy Town station, Hong Kong (2014)

- Breakfast Television Centre, London (1983)
- Limehouse Studios, London (1983)
- Embankment Place, London (1990)
- 125 London Wall (1992)
- Vauxhall Cross, London (1994)
- Edinburgh International Conference Centre (1995)
- British Consulate-General and British Council, Hong Kong (1996)
- Peak Tower, Hong Kong (1997)
- West Kowloon master plan, Hong Kong (1992–2002)
- Kowloon station, Hong Kong (1998)
- Dean Gallery, Edinburgh (1999)
- Incheon International Airport Transportation Centre, Seoul (2002)
- The Deep, Hull (2002)
- Tsuen Wan West station, Hong Kong (2003)
- Swiss Cottage Leisure Centre (2004)
- Home Office building, London (2005)
- Sheraton Resort Dameisha, Shenzhen (2007)
- The Green Building, Manchester (2007)
- Royal Institution refurbishment (2008)
- Greenwich Peninsula redevelopment, London (2008)
- Beijing South railway station (2008)
- Great North Museum, Newcastle (2009)
- BEA Finance Tower, Shanghai (2009)
- Bicester Eco-town (2009-ongoing)
- Earl's Court mixed-use redevelopment, London (2010-ongoing)
- Guangzhou South railway station (2010)
- Regent's Place, London (2010)
- KK100, Shenzhen (2011)
- Kennedy Town Swimming Pool (2011–16)
- Royal Albert Dock redevelopment, London (2013-ongoing)
- Vattanac Capital Tower, Phnom Penh (2014)
- Kennedy Town station, Hong Kong (2014)
- One Excellence Qianhai (2016)
- To Kwa Wan station, Hong Kong (2018)
- Sung Wong Toi station, Hong Kong (2018)
- China Zun, Beijing (2018)
- M+, Hong Kong (2019)
- Exhibition Centre station, Hong Kong (2020)
- Jurong East high-speed rail terminus, Singapore (2026)

== Notes ==
Bibliography

- Davies, Emma, ed. (2013). Collage and Context. London: Laurence King. ISBN 9781780672755.
- Farrell, Terry (2004). Place: A Story of Modelmaking, Menageries and Paper Rounds. London: Laurence King. ISBN 1856693325.
- Rosi, Adele (2008). UK > HK. Hong Kong: MCCM Creations. ISBN 978-9889984298.
