= Terry Farrell (architect) =

British architect (1938–2025)

Sir Terry Farrell CBE FRIBA FRSA FCSD
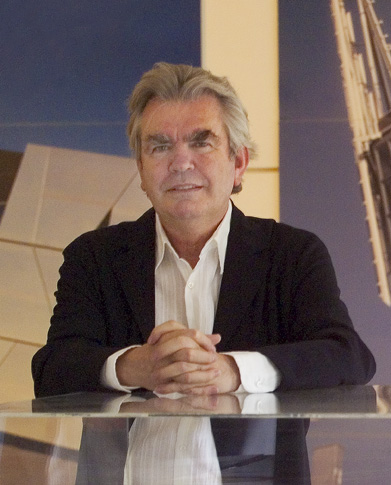
- Farrell in 2009
- Born: Terence Farrell; 12 May 1938; Sale, Cheshire, England
- Died: 28 September 2025 (aged 87); London, England
- Education: Newcastle University School of Architecture, Planning and Landscape; University of Pennsylvania
- Occupation: Architect
- Children: 5
- Practice: Farrells
- Buildings: KK100; The MI6 building Charing Cross station Edinburgh International Conference Centre; M+ Incheon International Airport; Beijing South railway station The Home Office building Peak Tower
- Website: Official website

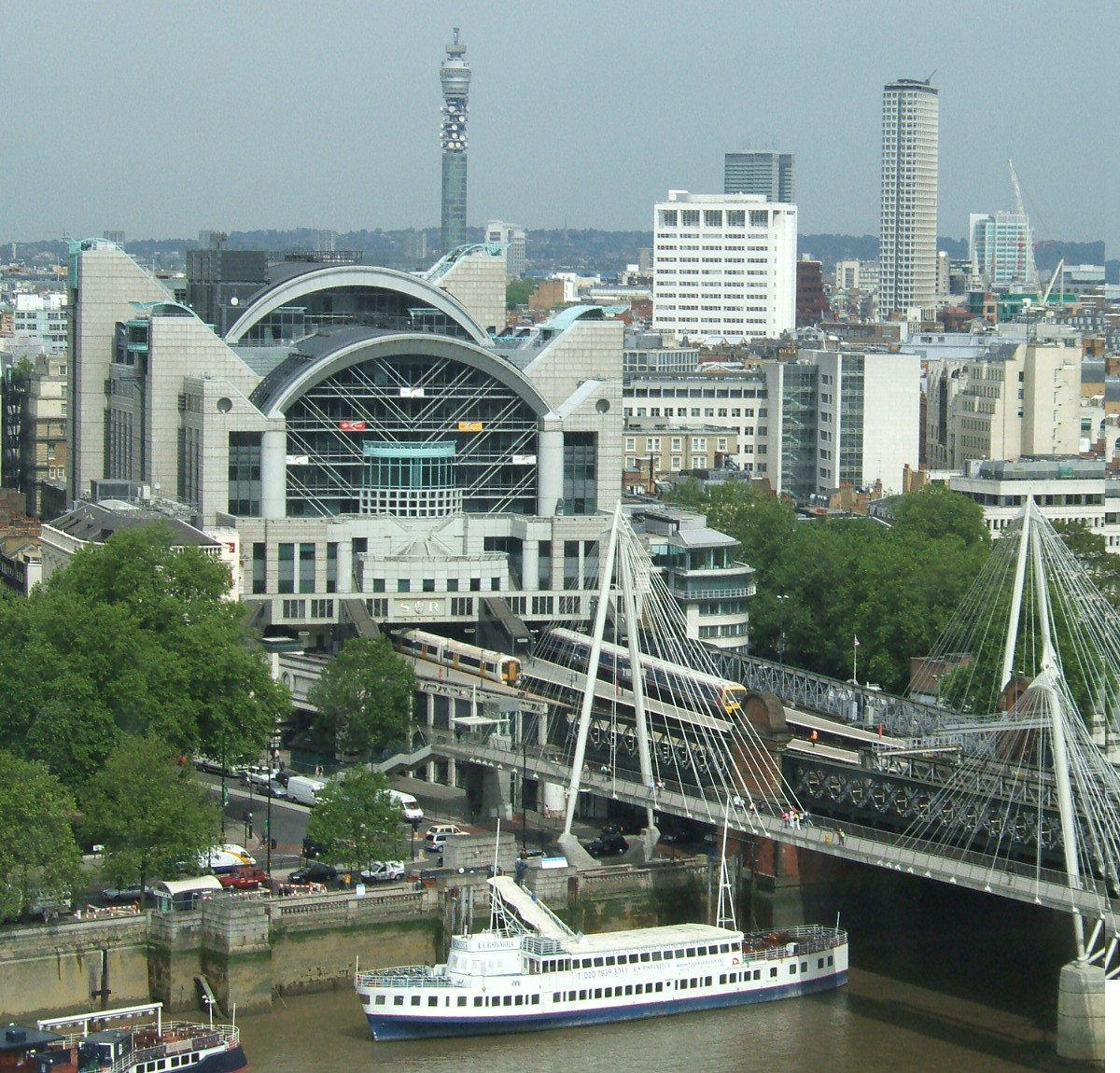
Charing Cross station in London, 1990

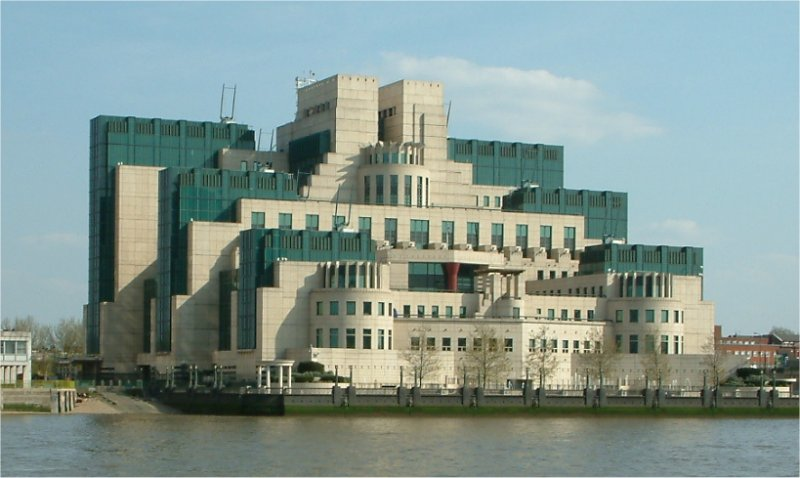
The SIS Building in London, 1994

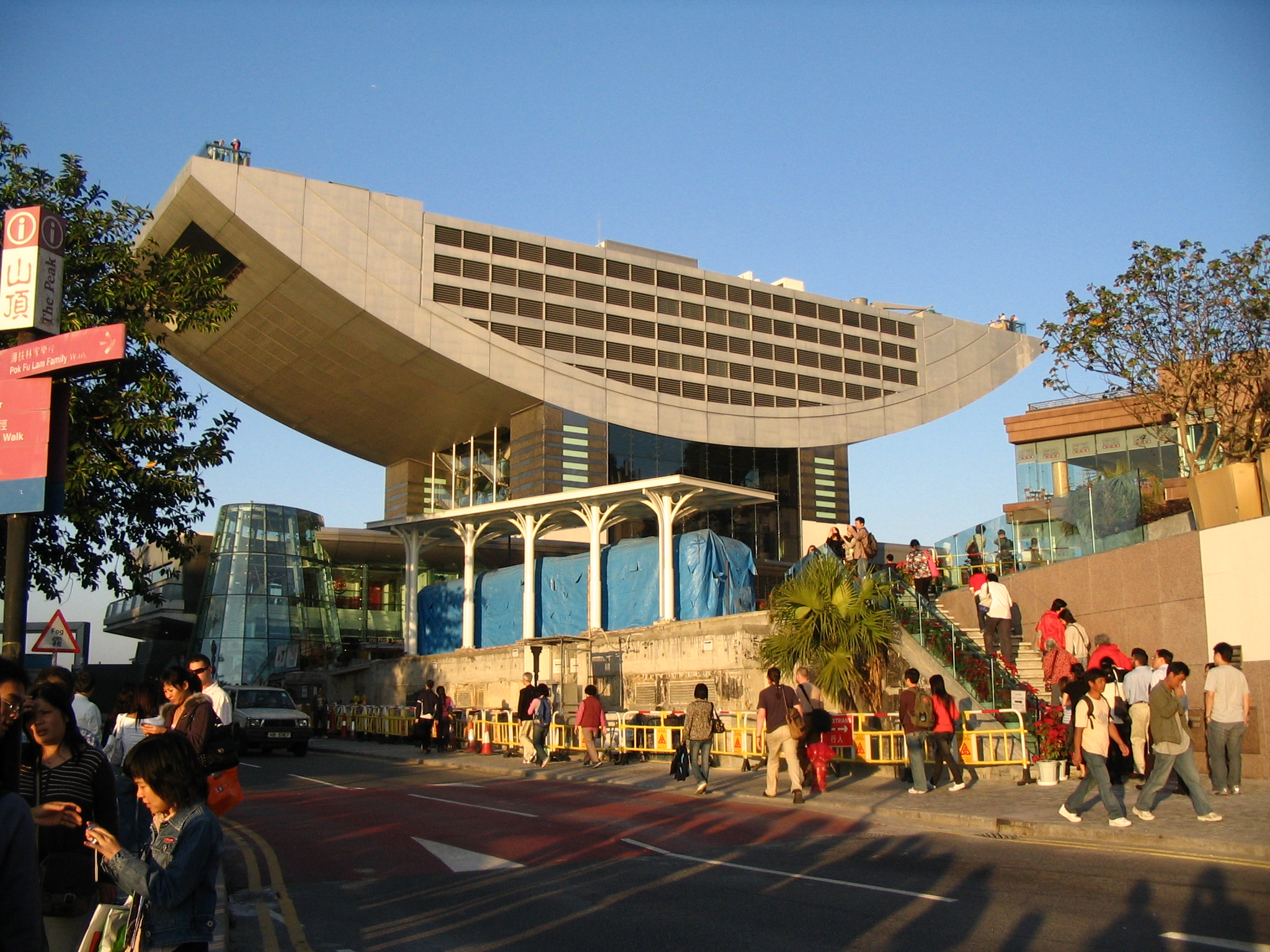
The Peak Tower in Hong Kong, 1995

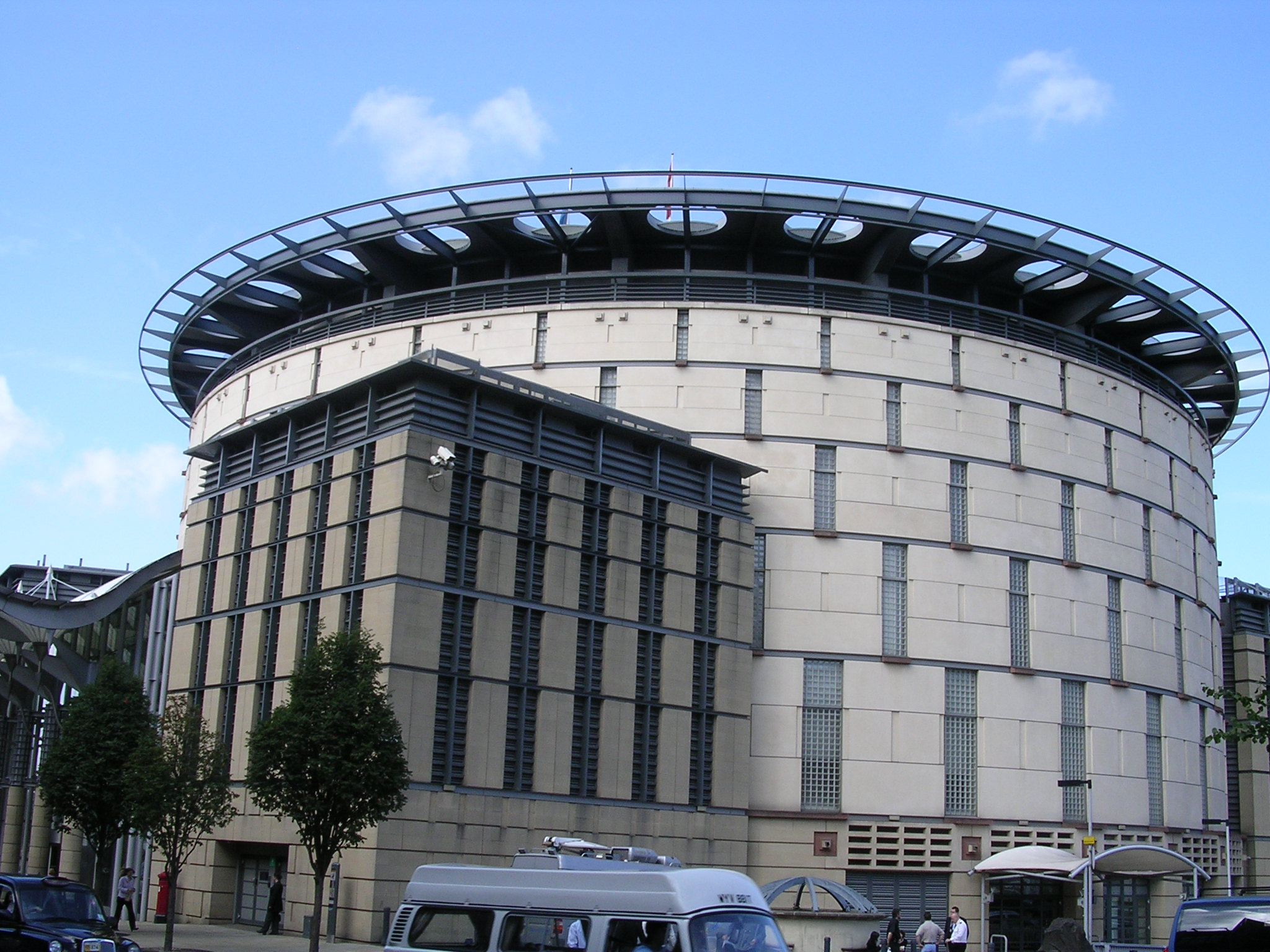
Edinburgh International Conference Centre in Edinburgh, 1995

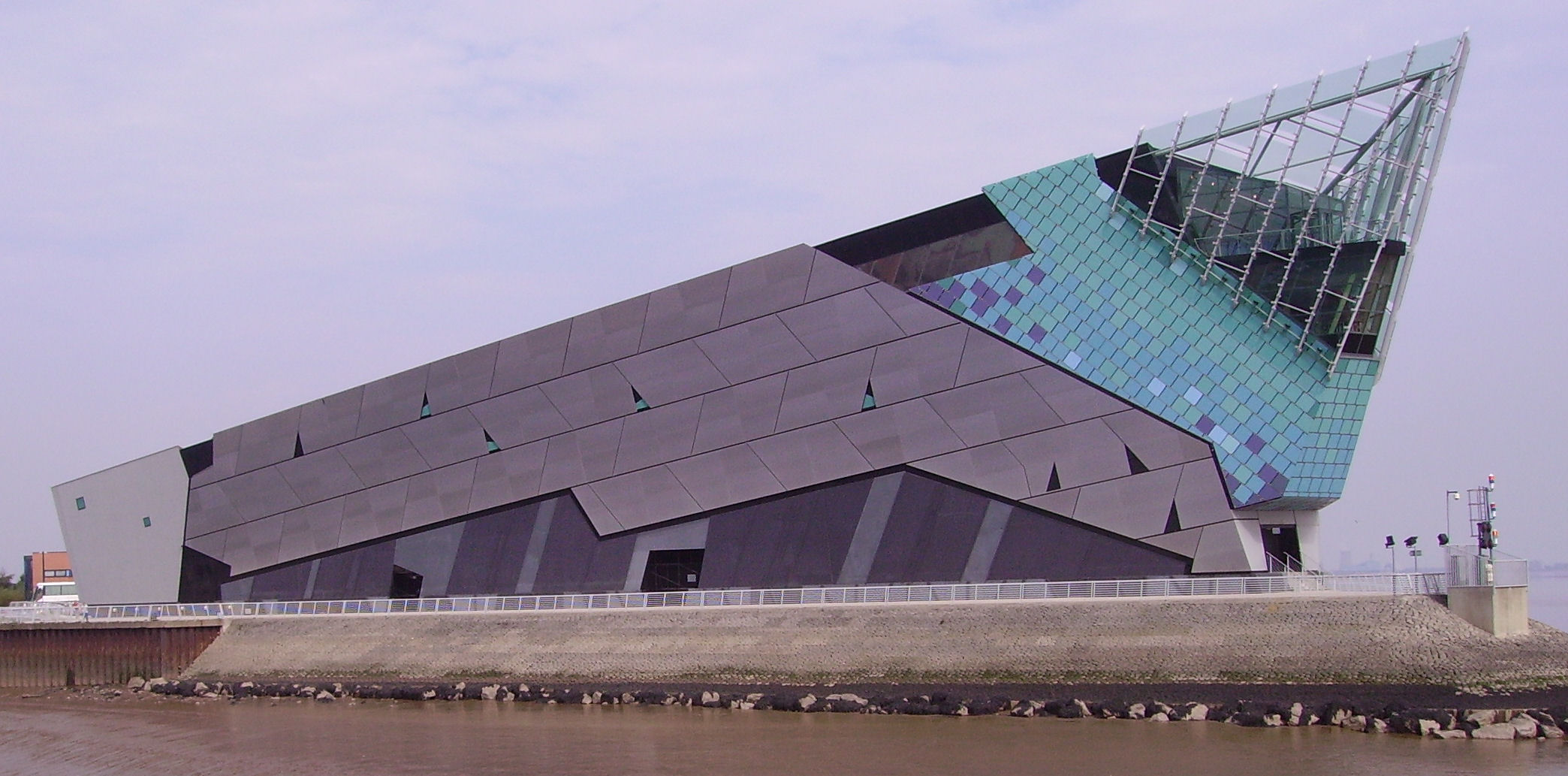
The Deep Aquarium in Hull, 2002

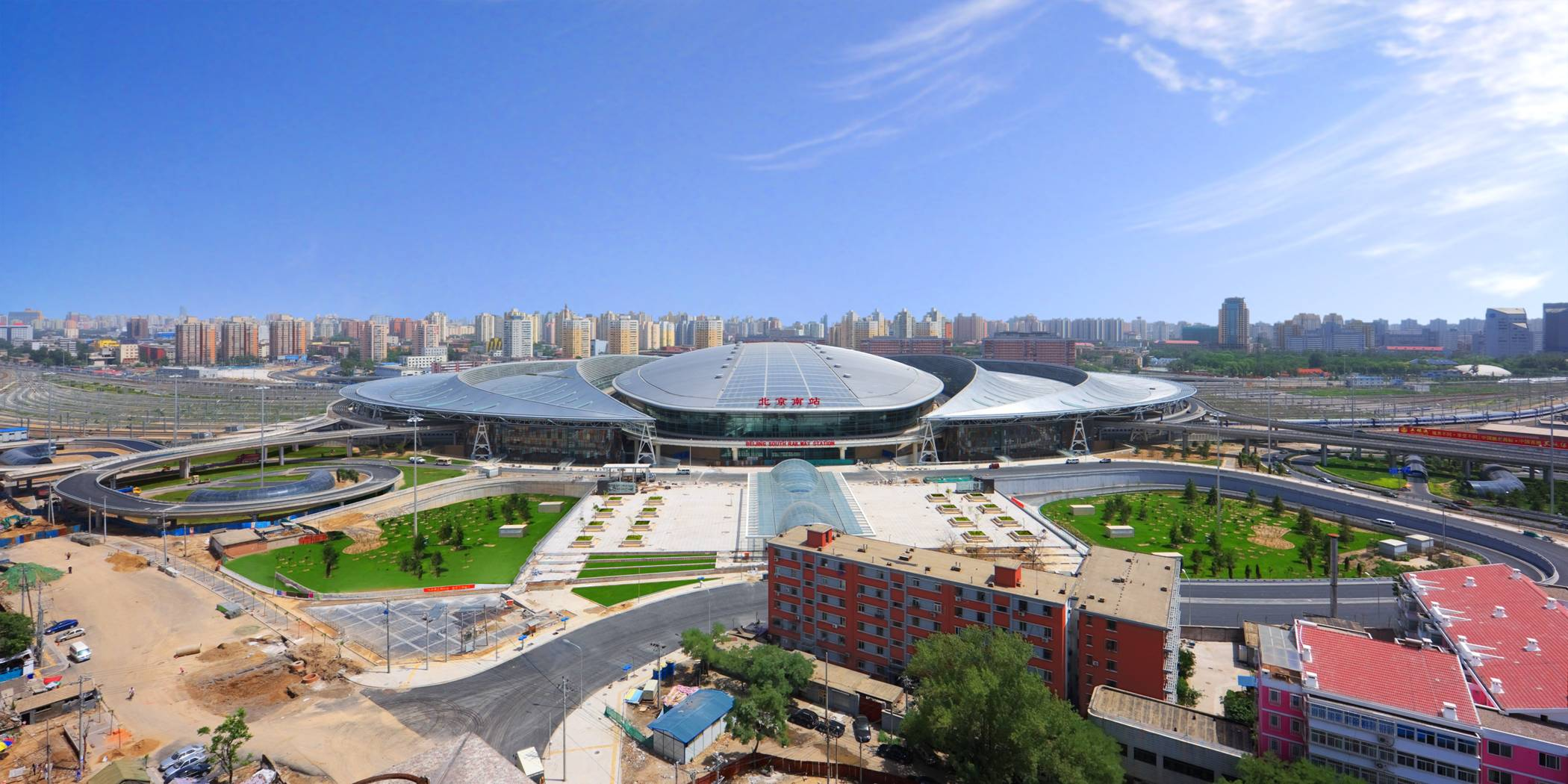
Beijing South railway station in Beijing, 2008

KK100 in Shenzhen, 2011

Sir Terence Farrell CBE FRIBA FRSA FCSD (12 May 1938 – 28 September 2025) was a British architect and urban designer.

In 1980, after working for 15 years in partnership with Nicholas Grimshaw, Farrell founded his own firm, Farrells. He established his reputation with three completed projects in London in the late 1980s: Embankment Place, 125 London Wall and the SIS Building. He created contextual urban design schemes, as well as works of postmodernism. In 1991, his practice opened an office in Hong Kong. In Asia his firm designed KK100 in Shenzhen and Guangzhou South railway station in Guangzhou.

== Early life and education ==
Terence Farrell was born on 12 May 1938 in Sale, Cheshire. His maternal grandfather was born in Manchester to an Irish mother who had emigrated to England from Ireland to escape the Great Famine. He moved to Newcastle upon Tyne at a young age and attended St Cuthbert's Grammar School. He graduated with a degree in architecture from the Newcastle University School of Architecture, Planning and Landscape (then part of Durham University) in 1965, which was followed by a Masters in Urban Planning at the University of Pennsylvania in Philadelphia.

== Career ==
In 1965, Farrell moved to London to form a partnership with Nicholas Grimshaw. He collaborated with Charles Jencks on the Cosmic House in Holland Park. In 1980, he founded his own company, Terry Farrell & Partners. In addition, Farrell lectured at a number of different universities including Cambridge University, the University of London, the University of Pennsylvania and the University of Sheffield.

In the early part of his career, Farrell gave emphasis to housing projects. Later, after the break with Grimshaw, he designed the TV-am headquarters in Camden Lock and redeveloped Comyn Ching Triangle in London's Covent Garden. In the 1980s and 1990s his projects included Charing Cross Station, the SIS Building, The Deep Aquarium in Hull and The International Centre for Life in Newcastle. Later work included the new headquarters for the Home Office, the conversion of the Grade I-listed Royal Institution of Great Britain and the Great North Museum in Newcastle.

He was responsible for regeneration projects of Newcastle Quayside, Brindleyplace in Birmingham, Edinburgh Exchange District, Greenwich Peninsula and Paddington Basin. He also designed his own buildings within these projects, including the Edinburgh International Conference Centre with the help of Duncan Whatmore, and The Point in Paddington Basin. In May 2010, he was appointed to regenerate the 72-acre (29 ha) area around the Earl's Court exhibition centre. In 2012 his practice was appointed as masterplanners for Wood Wharf – the next phase of Canary Wharf's development.

In East Asia, his projects included Incheon International Airport in Seoul and Beijing South railway station, the largest in Asia. When completed in December 2010 Guangzhou South railway station was for a time the largest railway station in the world. Subsequent to his setting up his practice in Hong Kong in 1990, he designed the Peak Tower, Kowloon Station development and the British Consulate-General, Hong Kong. His KK100 tower in Shenzhen is the tallest building ever by a British architect.

Farrell was on the Design Advisory Committee of the Mayor of London. In 2008 he was appointed Design and Planning Leader for the Thames Gateway, Europe's largest regeneration project.

Farrell was appointed Officer of the Order of the British Empire (OBE) in the 1978 Birthday Honours, promoted to Commander of the Order of the British Empire (CBE) in the 1996 New Year Honours for services to architecture, and knighted in the 2001 Birthday Honours for services to architecture and urban design.

He was made a visiting professor at the School of Architecture, Planning and Landscape at Newcastle University, and also an honorary freeman of Newcastle, in 2016. In 2018, he donated £1 million and his archive to the university. The Farrell Centre at the university opened in 2023.

== Personal life and death ==
Farrell married three times. He had five children.

He died on 28 September 2025, at the age of 87. Grimshaw predeceased him earlier that month.

== Selected awards ==
- The Herman Miller factory in Bath, UK (joint project with Nicholas Grimshaw), completed 1976: the Financial Times Industrial Award (1977), Civic Trust Award (1978), RIBA South West Award (1978), Grade II listing by English Heritage (2013)
- Comyn Ching Triangle, London: Civic Trust Award (1985), Grade II listing by English Heritage (2016)
- The Henley Regatta Headquarters, completed 1986: Civic Trust Award (1988), RIBA award (1988), Grade II listing (2018)
- Charing Cross railway station/Embankment Place, completed 1990: Civic Trust Award (1991 & 1994), RIBA National Award (1991), British Council of Offices Award (1994)
- Edinburgh International Conference Centre, completed 1995: (RIBA Award (1996), Civic Trust Award (1996)
- Newcastle Quayside, completed 1998: Civic Trust Urban Design Award (1998)
- Centre for Life, Newcastle upon Tyne, completed 2000: Civic Trust Award (2002)
- The Home Office building, completed 2005: (RIBA International Award (2005), LEAF Award for Best Public Building (2005), the MIPIM Award for Business Centres (2008)
- The Green Building in Manchester, ongoing: Civic Trust Award for Sustainability (2006 & 2010), LEAF Award for Best Environmentally Sustainable Project (2006)
- Beijing South railway station, completed in 2008: RIBA International Award (2009)
- Great North Museum, completed in 2009: RIBA Award for North East England (2010)
- The Earls Court Project, ongoing: MIPIM AR Future Projects Award for regeneration and planning (2011)

== Selected publications ==
- The Farrell Review of Architecture and the Built Environment (2014, Farrell Review)
- The City As A Tangled Bank: Urban Design versus Urban Evolution (2013, John Wiley & Sons, ISBN 978-1-118-48734-1)
- Shaping London: The patterns and forms that make the metropolis (2009, John Wiley & Sons, ISBN 978-0-470-69996-6)
- Architectural Review, Manifesto For London (September 2007, OCLC 915683607)
- Place: Terry Farrell's Life & Work: Early Years to 1981 (2004, Laurence King Publishing, ISBN 978-1-85669-332-5)
- Buckingham Palace Redesigned: A Radical New Approach to London's Royal Parks (2003, Papadakis, ISBN 978-1-901092-40-0)
- Terry Farrell in Scotland (2002, Tuckwell Press, ISBN 978-1-86232-275-2)
- Ten Years: Ten Cities: The Work of Terry Farrell & Partners 1991–2001 (2002, Laurence King Publishing, ISBN 978-1-85669-275-5)
- Sketchbook 12.05.98 (1998, Right Angle Publishing Ltd, ISBN 978-0-95328-480-1) with Robert Maxwell
- Designing a House (1986, Architectural Design, ISBN 978-0-31219-462-8) with Charles Jencks
