= The Green Building =

Building in Manchester, England

Coordinates: 53°28′25″N 2°14′34″W

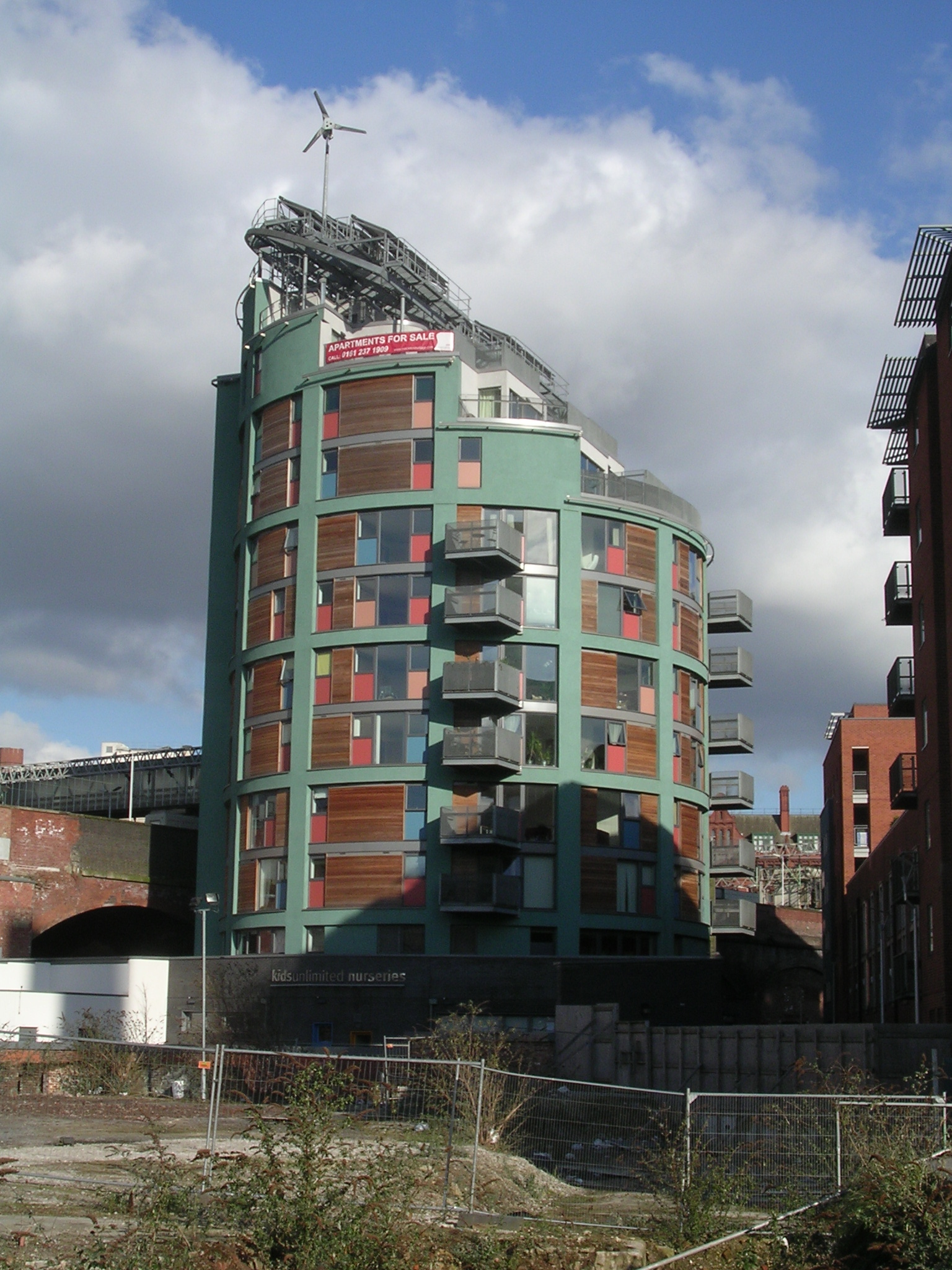
- The Green Building

General information
- Status: Completed
- Type: High-rise
- Architectural style: Sustainable architecture
- Location: 19 New Wakefield Street, Manchester, Greater Manchester, England

Design and construction
- Architect: Terry Farrell & Partners

The Green Building purports to be an environmentally conscious mixed-use development situated in Manchester, England. It was designed by Farrells, who aimed to create a sustainable environment on an unusual triangular plot, adjacent to Oxford Road station. The building was constructed by Taylor Woodrow as part of the Macintosh Village development, which was formerly a Dunlop tyre factory and also the birthplace of the Mackintosh raincoat.

A total of 32 apartments are arranged across the uppermost eight stories of the ten-floor development. The lower two levels contain a children's day nursery, operated by Bright Horizons, and a commercial unit that is currently vacant.

== Key features ==
- Energy-efficient thermal design.
- Solar thermal water heating system (not currently operational - the building has communal gas boilers) providing hot water for domestic plumbing and underfloor heating.
- Large full-height triple-glazed windows on the south-facing side maximise solar gain. The north-facing apartments have comparatively small windows.
- An internal central atrium interlinked with all apartments provides a passive air conditioning system. Warm air from each apartment passes into the central atrium and rises, drawing fresh cooler air into the apartments. Computer-controlled windows at the top of the atrium regulate air-flow.
- Building electrical requirements are supplemented by a nominal 2.5 kW wind turbine, though the location of the building within a city means that this is more for show than making a significant contribution (noting the considerable communal mains electricity consumption of the building).
- The cylindrical shape of the tower provides the least surface area related to the volume, somewhat increasing thermal efficiency.
- All apartments only have showers in the bathrooms; there are no baths in the residential apartments. The taps are designed to use the minimum amount of water necessary to wash hands safely.

== Performance ==
There are no performance figures currently available for the building. The communal heating and hot water system is, as of 2023, moving from a charging regime based on floor area (therefore the costs are socialised) to one based on actual usage, by the installation of heat meters. This is expected to reduce energy consumption, however the energy consumption (for instance communal electricity consumption) is still high compared with, say, a Passivhaus standard.

== Awards ==
In 2006, the architects Farrells were awarded a Sustainable Civic Trust Award for the Green Building development.

== Transport ==
Due to the city centre location of the Green Building, public transport links are in abundance. Subsequently, no car parking spaces were provided as part of the development. Limited space for bicycle storage is supplied with both internal and external facilities available.

The Green Building is located on New Wakefield Street adjacent to Oxford Road station.

There are two Metrolink tram stops close to the Green Building. Deansgate-Castlefield and St Peter's Square are nearby, both on most Metrolink lines.

The site the Green Building resides on has two public thoroughfares either side of the development, both pedestrianised. The main road for vehicle access is Great Marlborough Street, which has pay and display on-street parking for up to three hours.

Macintosh Village is connected to the Manchester Inner Ring Road via the Mancunian Way flyover that passes 300 metres (980 ft) to the south of the Green Building, which provides access to the national motorway network.

Oxford Road, claimed by some analysts to be part of the busiest bus corridor in Europe, is 75 m (246 ft) east of the Green Building, and provides bus links to the University of Manchester, Chorlton, Longsight, Piccadilly Gardens, Manchester Airport, The Trafford Centre and many other locations across the south of Greater Manchester.

== See also ==
- Energy efficiency in British housing
- BedZED development
