= Regent's Place =

Business, retail, and residential building in London

Coordinates: 51°31′32″N 0°08′28″W

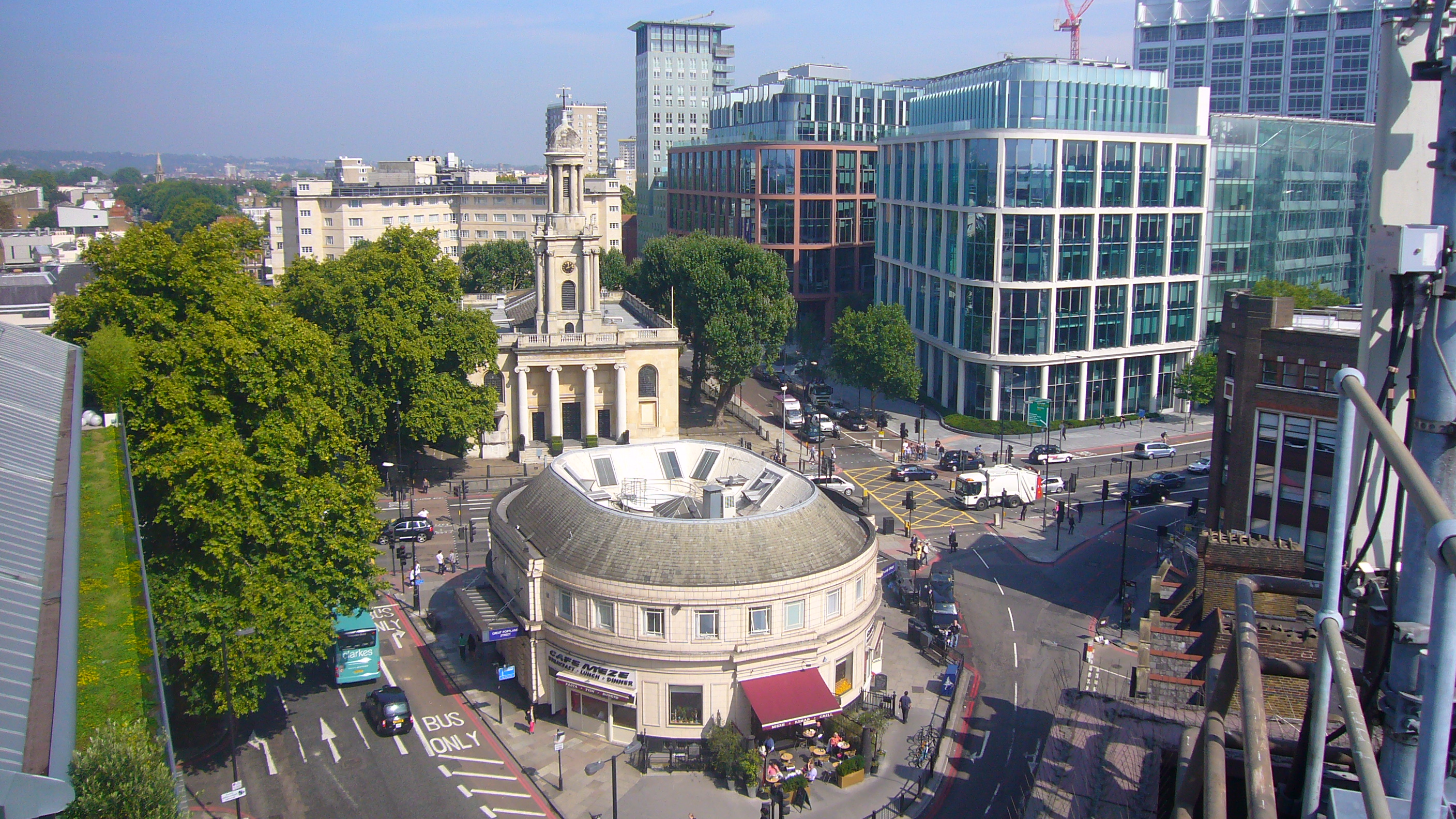
- Regent's Place as seen from the intersection of London's Euston Road and Great Portland Street
- Interactive map of the Regent's Place area

General information
- Status: Completed
- Type: Office; Retail; Residential
- Location: 338 Euston Rd, London NW1 3BT
- Current tenants: Debenhams plc
- Construction started: 1962
- Completed: 1972
- Owner: British Land

Design and construction
- Architect: Sidney Kaye
- Developer: Sidney Kaye and Partners
- Main contractor: British Land

Website
- www.regentsplace.com

Regent's Place is a mixed-use business, retail and residential quarter on the north side of Euston Road in the London Borough of Camden. The site is bounded by Osnaburgh Street to the west, Longford and Drummond Streets to the north, and Hampstead Road to the east.

Regent's Place was developed by British Land from an earlier speculative property development, the Euston Centre, which included Euston Tower, one of the first high-rise office developments in the West End. The tower is at the south western corner of the Regent's Place estate. The Euston Centre scheme was developed between 1962 and 1972 and was designed by Sidney Kaye. Originally the scheme was for a series of medium-rise blocks, but to create space for an underpass and road junction the LCC gave approval for the high-rise Euston Tower.

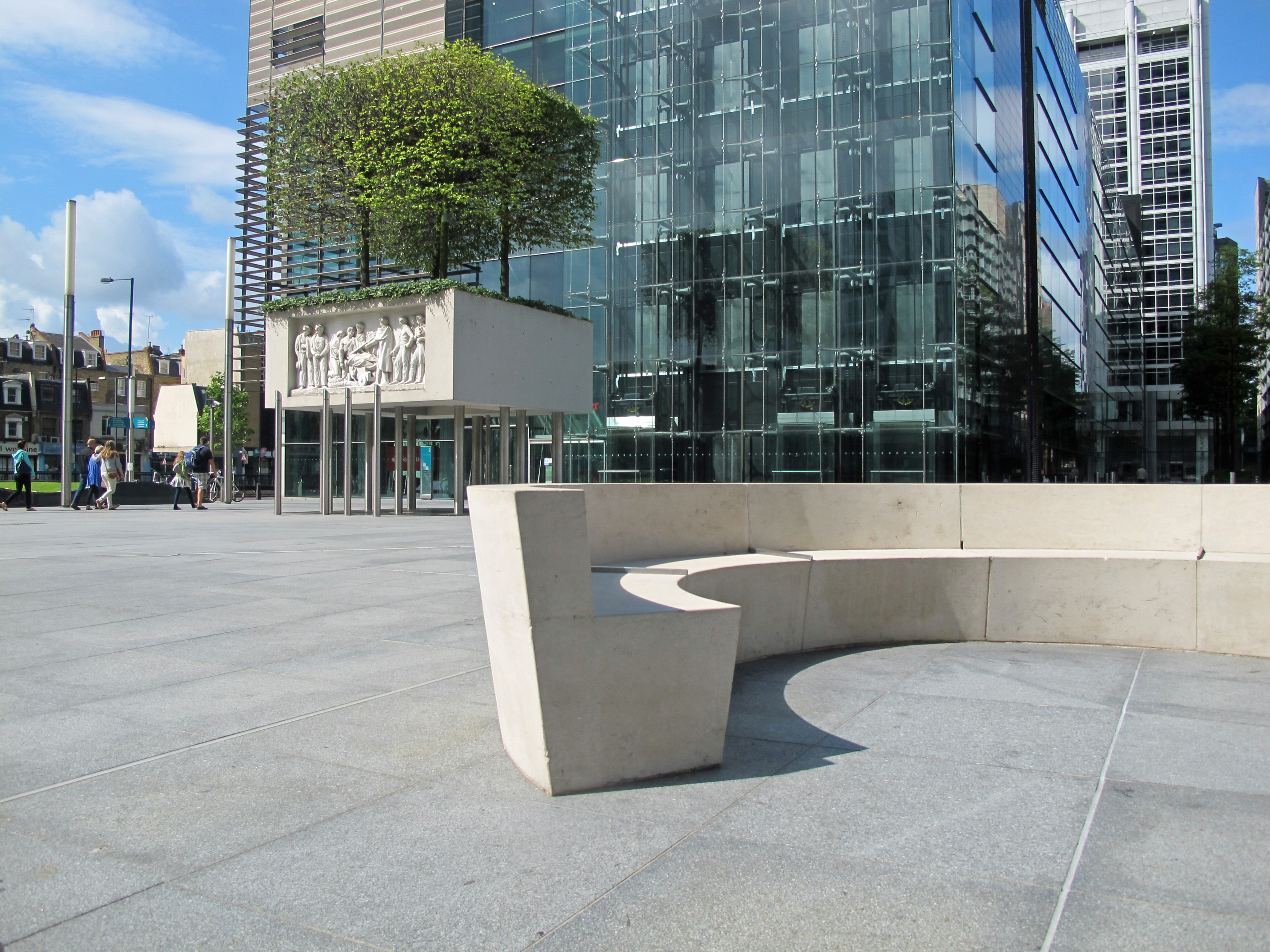
Triton Square plaza

Work by British Land on Regent's Place commenced in 1996. The first stage involved the demolition of the head office and studios of the former ITV company Thames Television and the subsequent development of the central part of the site and much of the Euston Road frontage, with four new office buildings and a pedestrian plaza called Triton Square. One of these buildings, called 2–3 Triton Square, was a new headquarters for what was then the UK's fifth largest bank by gross assets, Abbey National. The lower levels of Euston Tower were modernised at the same time. The development includes a shopping mall and an open space (Triton Square) that includes art features by Langlands and Bell. The developers also commissioned a large mural by Michael Craig-Martin, a lighting scheme by Liam Gillick and a smaller sculptural installation by Antony Gormley.

Work on a 45,500 sq m (490,000 sq ft) commercial and residential project designed by Terry Farrell on the western part of the site at Osnaburgh Street began in 2007, and was completed in 2009. It includes a community theatre and a multi-faith centre. A 48,200 sq m (519,000 sq ft) mixed used project for the north-eastern quadrant (immediately north of Euston Tower) was completed in July 2013. The project called for an innovative and stylish seating arrangement to be designed in a style similar to that of the Giant's Causeway in Northern Ireland. This has been achieved by manufacturing blocks of different sizes using Spanish Blue granite; they have been hollowed out to varying degrees and set onto galvanised steel frames, creating a variance in height.
