= Comyn Ching Triangle =

Triangular block in Covent Garden, London

Coordinates: 51.5133°N 0.1268°W

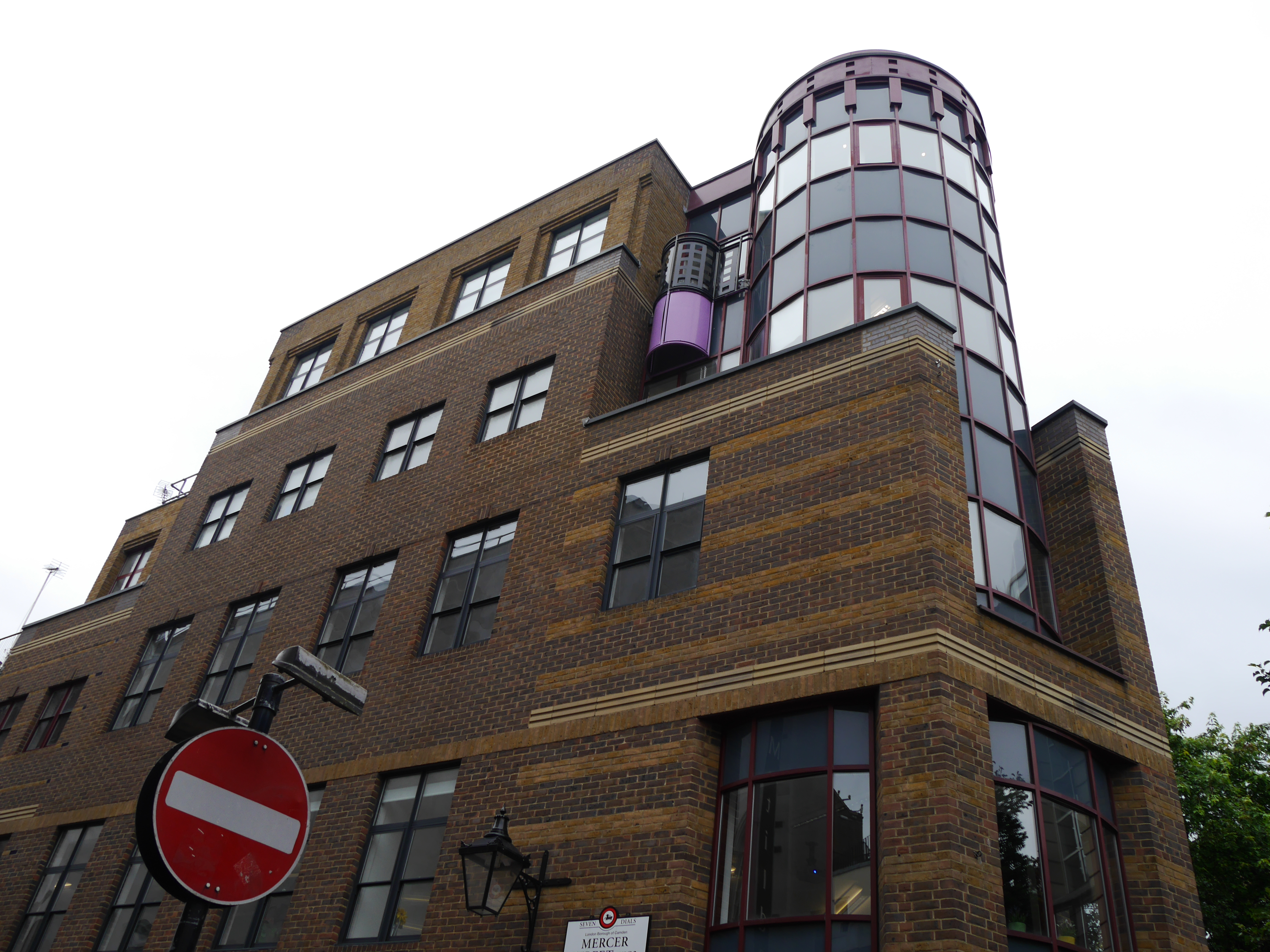
A building on Mercer Street, part of the Comyn Ching Triangle

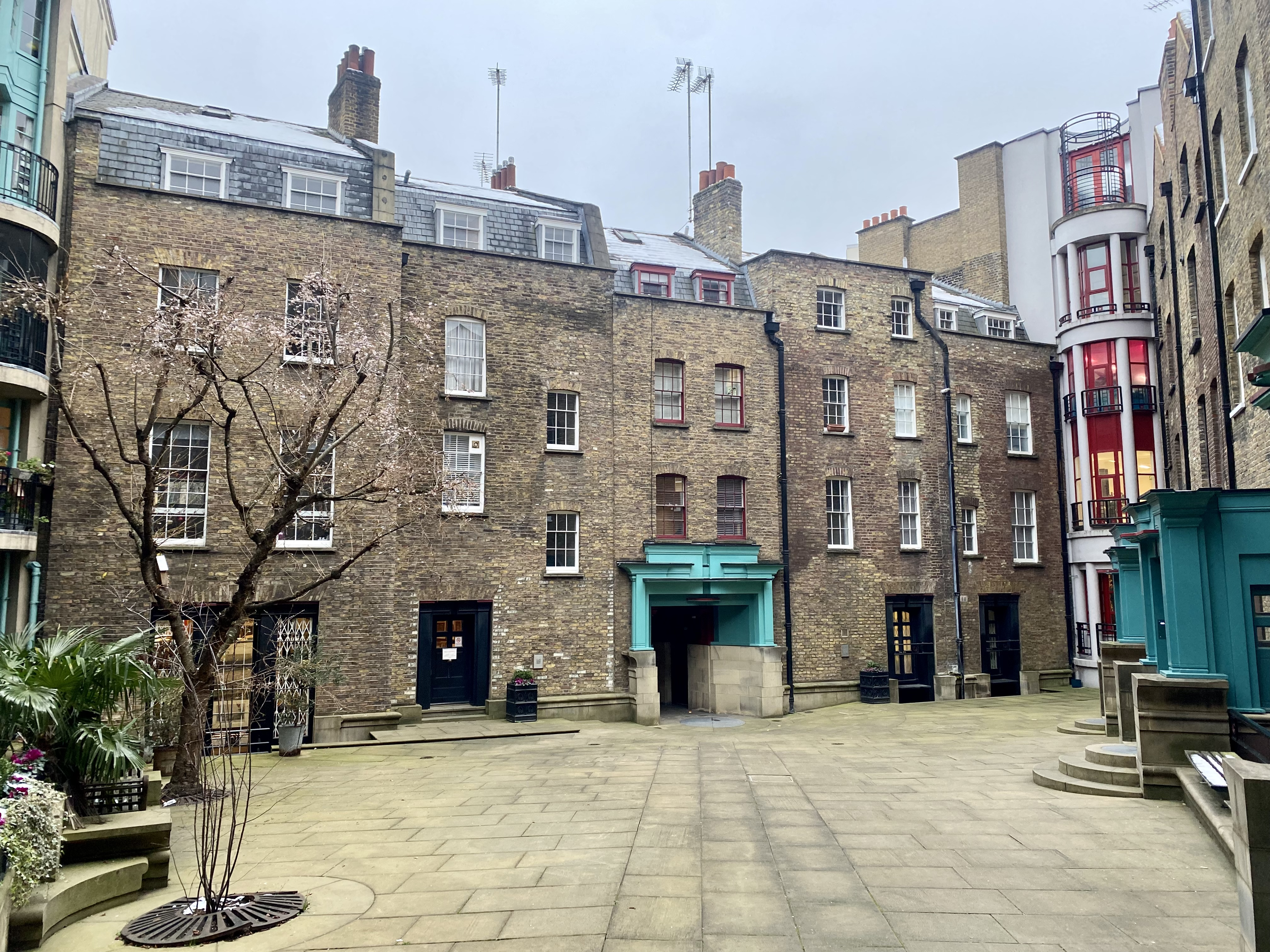
Ching Court

Comyn Ching Triangle is a triangular city block at the Seven Dials junction in Covent Garden, London. It is bounded by Monmouth, Mercer and Shelton Streets, and comprises a perimeter of terraced buildings surrounding Ching Court, a public space. A 1980s regeneration of the block by the architecture firm Terry Farrell and Partners is considered an exemplar of British postmodern architecture.

== History ==
The site was created when Thomas Neale laid out the Seven Dials area in 1692. By the 1970s the block was occupied by an ageing, densely-packed cluster of terraced houses surrounding a yard that had been completely filled with building extensions. The whole Seven Dials area was then considered run-down and ripe for wholesale redevelopment.

Between 1978 and 1988 Terry Farrell and Partners undertook a multi-phase regeneration of the block for the Comyn Ching architectural ironmongery, who had been in business on Shelton Street since before 1723 and owned the entire block. The scheme comprised the restoration of 25 early 18th century houses; three new infill buildings at the three corners of the block, replacing "poorer quality" 19th century buildings; and the clearance of the hodgepodge of building extensions in the centre of the block to create a new public square called Ching Court.

The regeneration was commenced in consultation with the Greater London Council historic buildings division. The three new buildings at the corner lots were sold to private developers to finance the repair of the historic listed buildings. Comyn Ching and Company moved their operations to Holborn but kept a showroom at 17-19 Shelton Street. The three new buildings were each designed to respond to their particular context, but also to complement one another and the existing urban fabric.

== Reception ==
The scheme was well received by historians and architects as an exemplary work of urban regeneration. It won a Civic Trust Award in 1985.

Brian Ashley Barker, architect and former director of the Heritage of London Trust, wrote in the Architects' Journal of 6 March 1985: "Where the old fabric has been kept it has been revered and treated seriously; but in the final result we are not so much aware of old and new co-existing side by side as of one single lively identity embodied in the still recognisable historic streets."

The 2014 book London's Contemporary Architecture: An Explorer's Guide, by Ken Allison and Victoria Thornton, praised the "extraordinary" detailing of the scheme and called it a "fine urbanistic exercise whose stylistic tropes are now so unfashionable that, some 30 years later, we still find it difficult to acknowledge the work". In the same year the columnist Sir Simon Jenkins cited Comyn Ching as an example of "postmodernism’s skill at context", calling the scheme "little-noticed (and therefore brilliant)". In support of the 2016 historic listing bid, Henrietta Billings of the Twentieth Century Society called Comyn Ching "an important and influential example of postmodern urban development that fully deserves recognition and protection through listing".

Several other noted architectural theorists wrote to Historic England in support. Charles Jencks stated: "This post-modern strategy of creating what could be called the Time City has today become much more prevalent even among modernists – witness Norman Foster at Berlin’s Reichstag or David Chipperfield’s mixed methods at the Neues Museum in the same city – but Comyn Ching was the first example here 40 years before, and should be preserved and celebrated for starting this more inclusive approach."

Deyan Sudjic called the scheme "a painstaking piece of urban embroidery, lovingly carried out by an architectural team determined to do things differently from the dogmatic approaches of the past, combining mixed-use development, creative insertion, and handsome restoration".

Architectural critic Jonathan Glancey wrote: "With its unexpected courtyard, its intriguing passageways, fairy-tale entrances, rich use of materials and colour, and imaginative corner towers, Farrell's Comyn Ching is an enchanting development [...] The scheme is also important because, both physically and ideologically, it marks a major break away from the kind of comprehensive redevelopment that, fashionable until the early 1970s, would have seen not just Seven Dials, but effectively the whole of Covent Garden swept away for inept and insensitive new development."

Rowan Moore said: "it is becoming an increasingly important and pressing question which works of this period should be protected by listing. Comyn Ching is up there with the best, representing Farrell’s thinking about the urban fabric and its renovation. It is also one of the best examples of his use of ornament."

== Proposed alterations ==
In late 2015 Rolfe Judd Planning, on behalf of property investor Shaftesbury and Morrow & Lorraine Architects, submitted a planning application to Camden London Borough Council for alterations to Comyn Ching Triangle. These include the removal of a triangular window at Monmouth and Shelton streets, meant to echo the triangular plan of the Seven Dials blocks, replacing it with a flush window behind balconets, as well as the replacement of wooden doors on Shelton Street to provide level access.

Terry Farrell strongly objected to the proposal, stating: "The removal of the triangular motif that runs up the front of the building, which provides it with an unusually dynamic push-and-pull, in-and-out geometry that speaks rather powerfully to the junction of Shelton and Monmouth, would effectively drain it of much of its effect. To replace this with a run-of-the-mill, uniform flat window and balcony is not acceptable." The alterations were announced the same week as proposed changes to 76 Fenchurch Street, another postmodern Farrell building from the same era which he is also trying to preserve.

The proposed changes were approved by the council in early 2016. In response his practice, Farrells, has applied to Historic England for an urgent listing of the scheme. Adam Nathaniel Furman, a researcher at Farrells, explained that the company hopes Comyn Ching "can set a precedent that post-modern architecture is worth protection".

== Listing ==
Several component buildings of the Triangle have been designated listed buildings: 53-71 Monmouth Street, 21-27 Mercer Street and 11-19 Shelton Street were all designated at Grade II in January 1973.

In November 2016 Historic England announced a Grade II listing of the postmodernist elements of Farrell's scheme, specifically 45-51 Monmouth Street, 19 and 29-31 Mercer Street, and 21 Shelton Street. They stated: "Comyn Ching Triangle represents Postmodernism at its purest and is an early, masterful exercise in placemaking by one of the country’s leading architects. It is widely seen as one of Terry Farrell’s most important works of the time where he delivered much-needed urban regeneration to Covent Garden by keeping, respecting and integrating historic buildings, rather than redeveloping the site."
