= Edinburgh International Conference Centre =

Convention center in Scotland

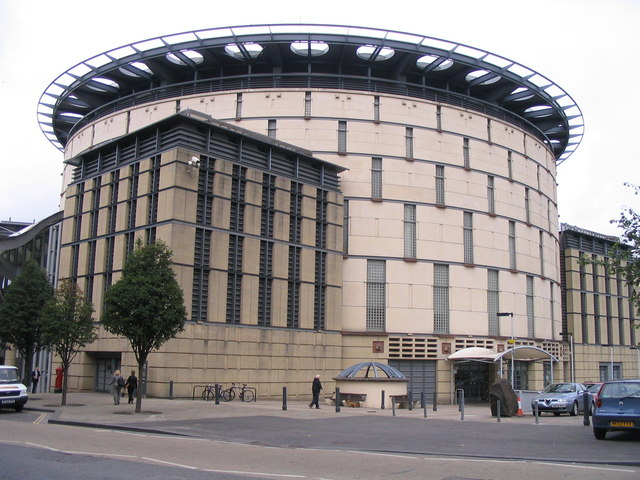
- Main building of the EICC
- Interactive map of the Edinburgh International Conference Centre area

General information
- Status: Completed
- Location: The Exchange; 150 Morrison Street; Edinburgh; EH3 8EE
- Coordinates: 55°56′45.99″N 3°12′34.73″W
- Construction started: 1993
- Completed: 1995

Design and construction
- Architect: Farrells
- Engineer: Arup

Website
- www.eicc.co.uk

The Edinburgh International Conference Centre (EICC) is a convention and conference centre in Edinburgh, Scotland.

== Location ==
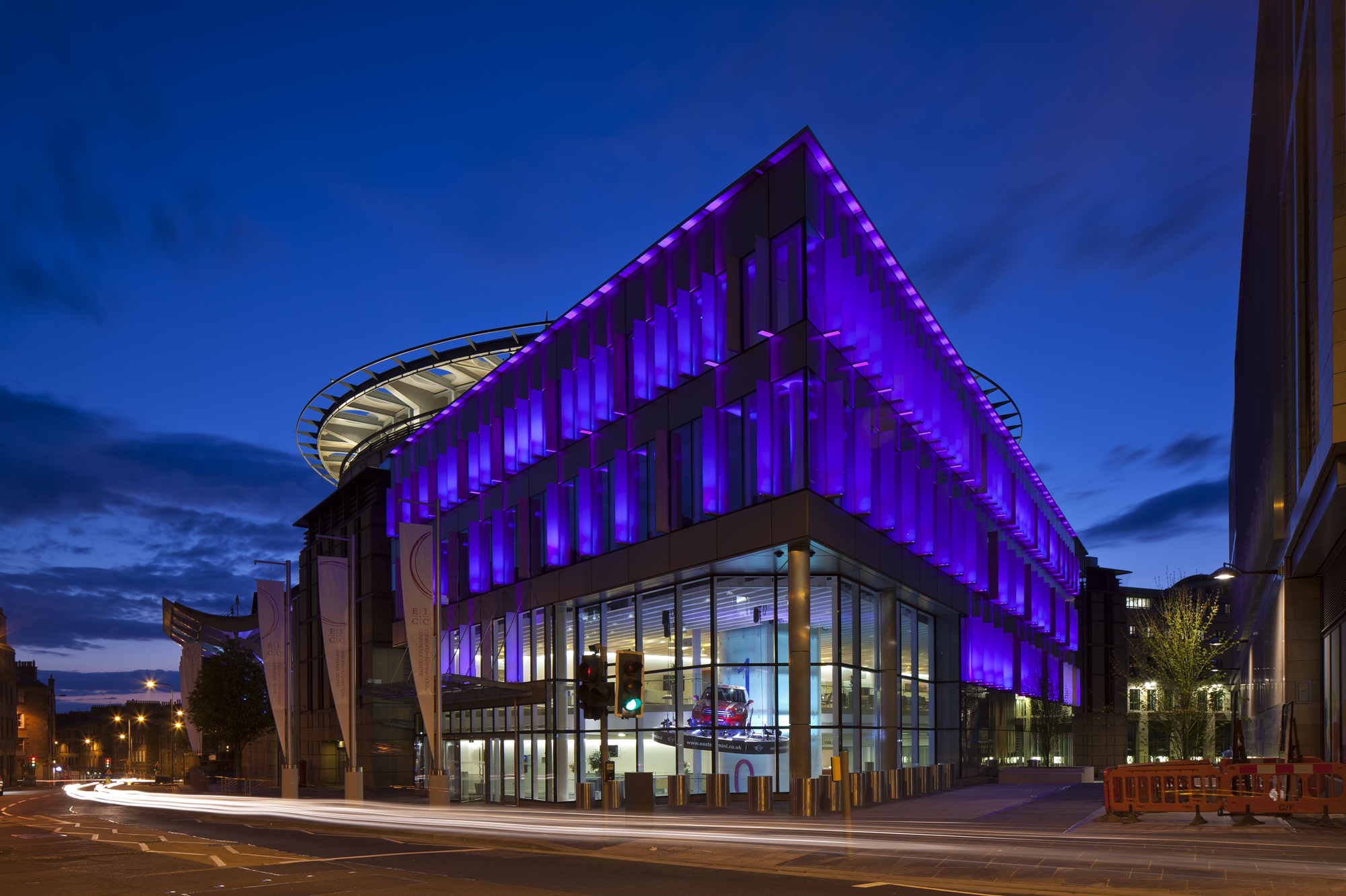
EICC Exterior at night, taken from Morrison Street by David Barbour

The centre is part of the masterplanned Exchange District in the west end of the city, and was designed by the architect Sir Terry Farrell who ran the project from his Edinburgh office with his team, opened to manage this project and other work in the Exchange.

The venue is located in central Edinburgh, near Haymarket railway station, Edinburgh Castle and Princes Street Gardens.

== Building ==
Construction on the EICC began in March 1993 and the centre opened in September 1995. It hosts approximately 200,000 delegates every year and has generated over £930 million in revenue for the City of Edinburgh Council since opening in 1995. An extension opened in 2013 at a cost of £85 million, roughly doubling the capacity of the venue.

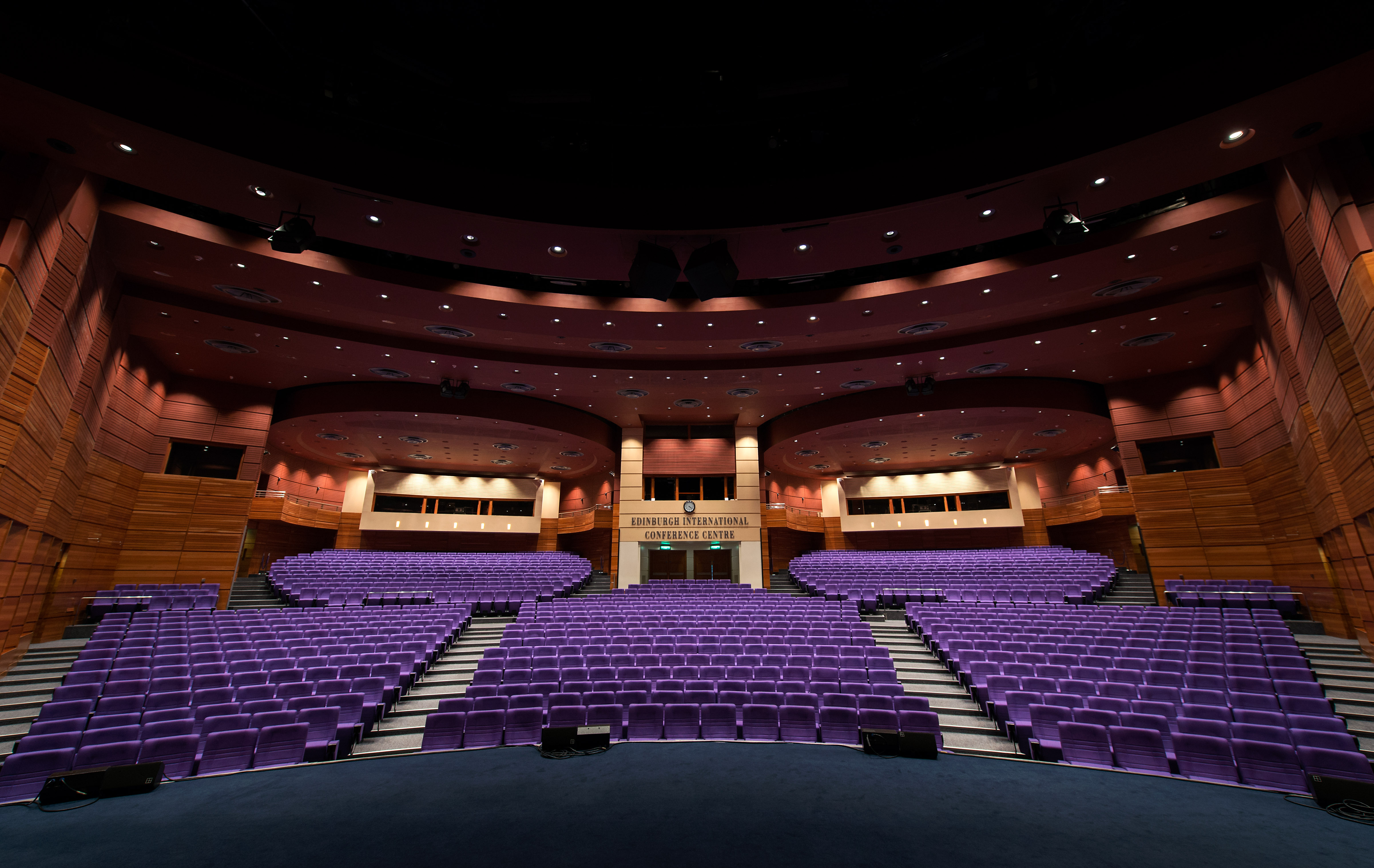
The Pentland Suite of EICC, taken by Malcolm Cochrane in 2014

EICC contains a revolving auditorium, allowing the capacity to be adjusted between 600 and 1,200. Additionally, the Lennox Suite's 2,000 capacity room contains a hall-wide tension wire grid and moving floor which allows the floor layout to be reconfigured for different events.

The maximum capacity of the venue is 5,760 across over 8,000 m^{2} of floor space, containing 8 suites, 24 event rooms and 2 reception areas.

== Notable events ==
In 1999 the annual General Assembly of the Church of Scotland was held at the EICC. The Church's Assembly Hall was being used by the Scottish Parliament at the time.

The Commonwealth Heads of Government Meeting 1997 (CHOGM) was held at the EICC. To commemorate this occasion, the Clydesdale Bank issued a special commemorative £20 note. The reverse side featured an illustration of the EICC building alongside the new Clydesdale Bank building on Lothian Road, with Edinburgh Castle in the background.

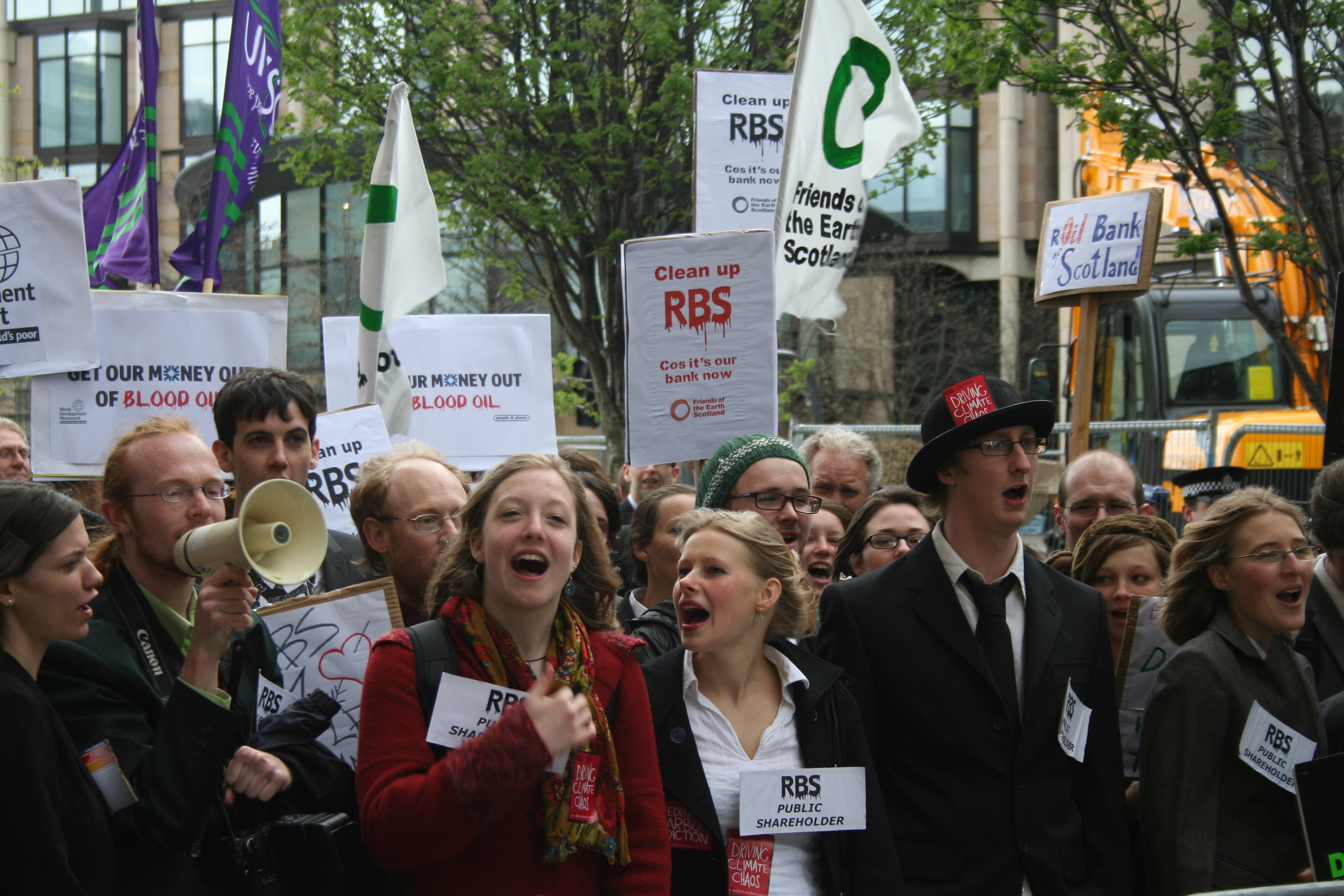
Protest outside the RBS AGM at the EICC, 2010

Between 2008 and 2011 protests took place at the EICC on the occasion of the RBS AGM, responding to several controversies including the bank's bailout-out by the UK Government and concerns about the bank's funding of fossil fuel companies.

The EICC has been an official venue of the Edinburgh Festival Fringe since 2017. It is also the main venue for the Edinburgh International Television Festival.

TED held their TEDSummit at the EICC in July 2019 with speakers including former First Minister Nicola Sturgeon and musician KT Tunstall.

In January 2021, EICC opened as a vaccine clinic for the COVID-19 outbreak, administering over 250,000 vaccines for NHS Scotland.
