= 125 London Wall =

Building in the City of London

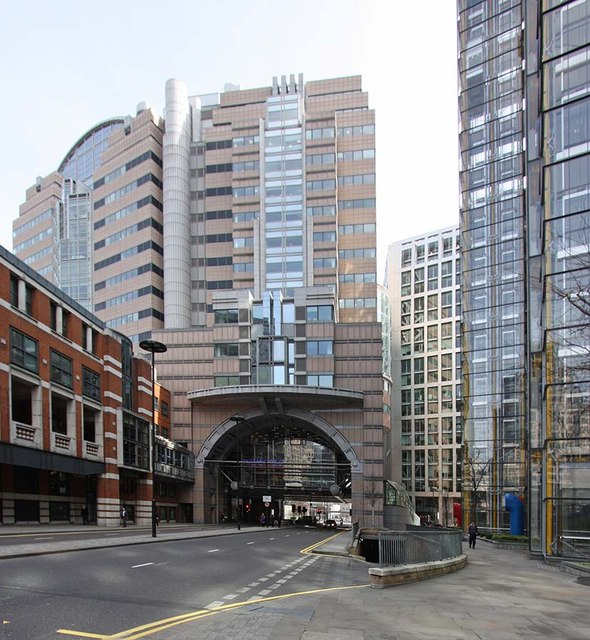
- 125 London Wall pictured in 2009

- Location within Greater London

General information
- Status: Completed
- Architectural style: Postmodernism
- Location: London Wall, London, EC2, United Kingdom
- Coordinates: 51.5175°N 0.0938°W
- Construction started: 1990
- Opened: 14 October 1992
- Cost: £175 million
- Owner: Blackstone

Height
- Height: 82 m (270 ft)

Technical details
- Floor count: 18
- Floor area: 385,000 sq ft (35,800 m^{2})
- Lifts/elevators: 15

Design and construction
- Architect: Farrells
- Developer: MEPC plc
- Engineer: Arup

125 London Wall, also known as Alban Gate, is a postmodernist building on London Wall in the City of London. Along with Embankment Place and Vauxhall Cross (the SIS Building), it has been described as one of the three projects that established designer Sir Terry Farrell's reputation in the late 1980s-to-early 1990s period. In 2004, writer Deyan Sudjic described it as "postmodernism at its most exuberant", placing it at number 5 in a list of Ten Triumphs of recent UK architecture.

== History ==
The district was once the northeast corner of the Roman settlement Londinium. Though one of the oldest settled parts of the city, the area was devastated during The Blitz. It was redeveloped in the postwar decades according to modernist planning principles centred on the automobile. London Wall became an "unpleasant 1960s dual carriageway", a "mini-motorway which acted as divisively upon its surroundings as the old wall had". The sites surrounding the roadway were developed under high-rise schemes including the Barbican Estate to the north. The site beside the road upon which Alban Gate was built was originally home to Lee House, a modernist office complex. In 1986, spurred by Margaret Thatcher's "Big Bang" deregulation of financial markets and the need for more large-floorplate modern office space, planning permission was granted for the demolition of Lee House.

== Design ==
Construction of the complex began in 1990, and was completed in 1992 with 18 floors and a maximum height of 82 m (270 ft). Architects Terry Farrell and Partners sought to bridge the urban barrier of London Wall by utilising the air rights over the roadway. The complex is composed of two twin towers, set at a 90-degree angle to each other, with one straddling London Wall itself and offering pedestrian passage via an arcade housing shops and restaurants suspended over the road.

The other tower sits on a heavily modelled podium meant to repair the urban fabric, countering the "agoraphobia" and poor pedestrian circulation of the earlier 1960s modernist schemes. The tower plinth and adjacent low romanesque block relate to the scale of surrounding buildings as well as shielding Monkwell Square, which had become a "service yard", from the motorway. Monkwell Square was redesigned and landscaped.

Though the towers are visually distinct, their floorplates are actually connected and share a central service core. The 18th floor of one tower houses a special meeting suite.

== Tenants ==
The building is well known as the former UK headquarters of JPMorgan Chase, one of the world's leading investment banks. Nabarro LLP leased 138,000 sq ft (12,800 m^{2}) in 2012.

Most of the building now holds Lloyds Banking Group offices.

== Ownership ==
In 2000, MEPC plc sold the building for around £160 million. In July 2010, it was part of a group of six landmark London properties sold to the Carlyle Group for £671 million following the default of Simon Halabi's property companies. In 2014, the building was purchased by Blackstone for £300 million.

== Notes ==
Bibliography

- Davies, Emma, ed. (2013). Collage and Context. London: Laurence King. ISBN 9781780672755.
