= KK100 =

Supertall skyscraper in Shenzhen, Guangdong, China

Coordinates: 22°32′45″N 114°06′06″E

KK100 京基100
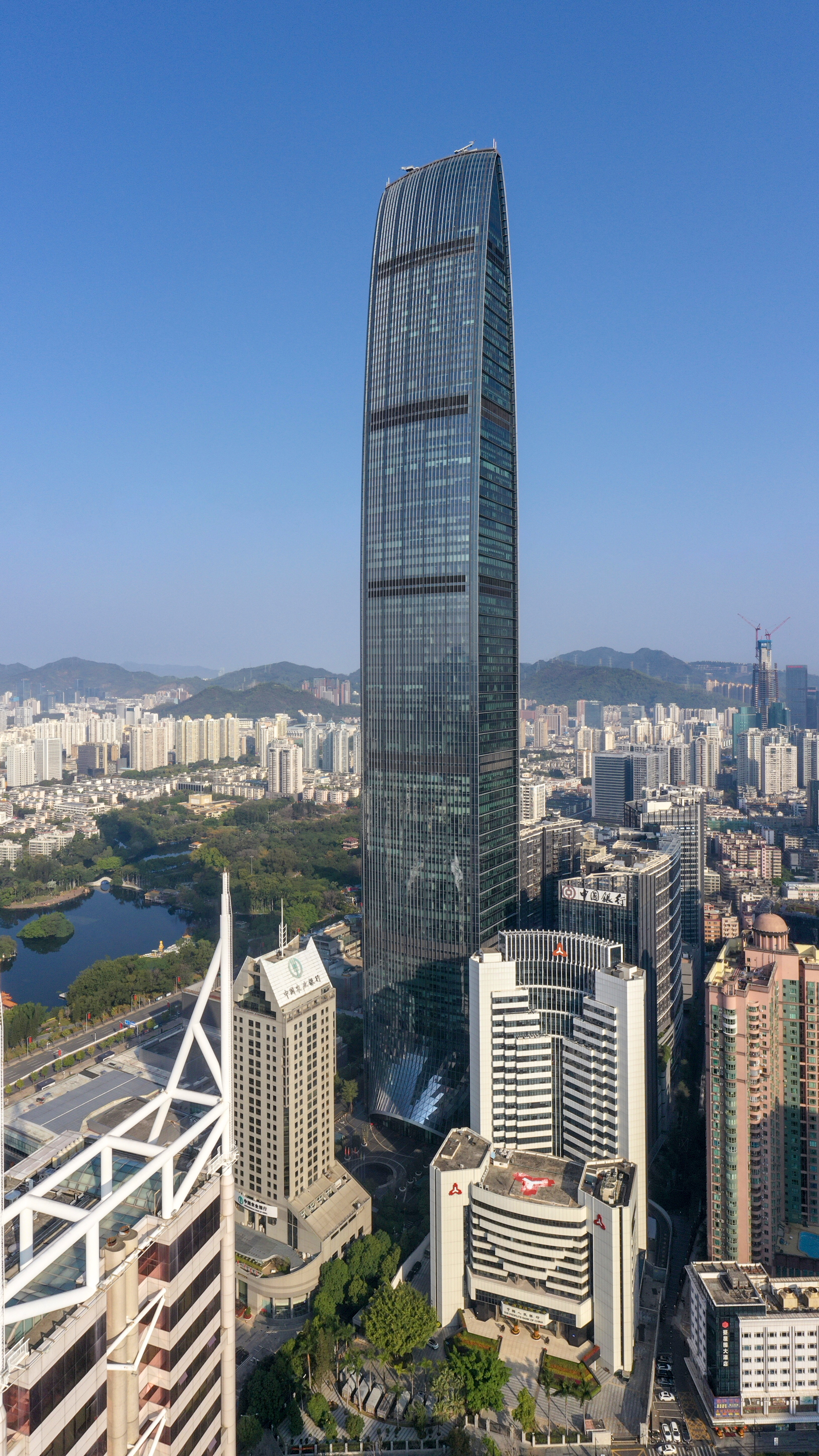
- The KK100 in February 2021
- Interactive map of the KK100 京基100 area
- Former names: Kingkey 100; Kingkey Finance Tower

General information
- Status: Completed
- Type: Hotel & Office
- Location: 5016 Shennan East Road, Luohu District, Shenzhen, Guangdong, China
- Construction started: 22 October 2007
- Completed: 21 September 2011
- Opening: 23 November 2011
- Cost: 5 billion RMB; 785 million USD
- Owner: Kingkey Group

Height
- Architectural: 442 m (1,450 ft)
- Tip: 442 m (1,450 ft)
- Top floor: 427 m (1,401 ft)
- Observatory: 427 m (1,401 ft)

Technical details
- Floor count: 100
- Floor area: 220,000 square metres (2,368,060 ft^{2})
- Lifts/elevators: 66

Design and construction
- Architect: TFP Farrells
- Structural engineer: Arup
- Main contractor: China Construction Fourth Engineering Division Corp. Ltd.

KK100, formerly known as Kingkey 100 and Kingkey Finance Tower, is a 100-story, 442 m (1,450 ft) supertall skyscraper in Shenzhen, Guangdong, China.

== Location ==
Located on Shennan East Road and within Caiwuwei, an area often described as the 'financial district' of Shenzhen. It belongs to Shenzhen's Luohu District and is situated east of Lizhi Park, approximately one kilometer north of the border between mainland China and Hong Kong.

The mixed-use building rises 442 m (1,450 ft) and contains 98 floors for office space and a hotel. Out of those 100 floors, 74 are used for 173,000 square metres (1,862,157 ft^{2}) of Class A office space, 26 stories for a 35,000 square metres (376,737 ft^{2}) six-star business hotel and the top four floors of the skyscraper hold a garden and several restaurants. Adjacent to KK100 is the KK Mall, which opened its doors November 26, 2010, and contains luxury brand stores, restaurants and a supermarket. The KK Mall also hosts Shenzhen's first IMAX cinema.

The St. Regis Hotel occupies floors 75 to 100 of the main tower, which opened in September 2011.

The lobby of the St. Regis Hotel is on the 96th floor. There are 4 elevators between the 1st and 96th floor, with two elevators stopping at floors 1, 5 and 96 and another 2 that only service floors 1 & 96). These 4 elevators are made by Mitsubishi and can reach speeds of 9 m/s (1800 FPM).

== Appearance ==
It is currently the second tallest building in Shenzhen, and the 14th tallest building in the world. It is the tallest building ever designed by a British architect.

There is a water fountain in front of the building, and an observation deck near the top. In December 2011, the Emporis Skyscraper Award awarded the building a fourth place.

The building has a height-width ratio of 9.5:1, thus becoming one of China's slimmest buildings.

== Image gallery ==
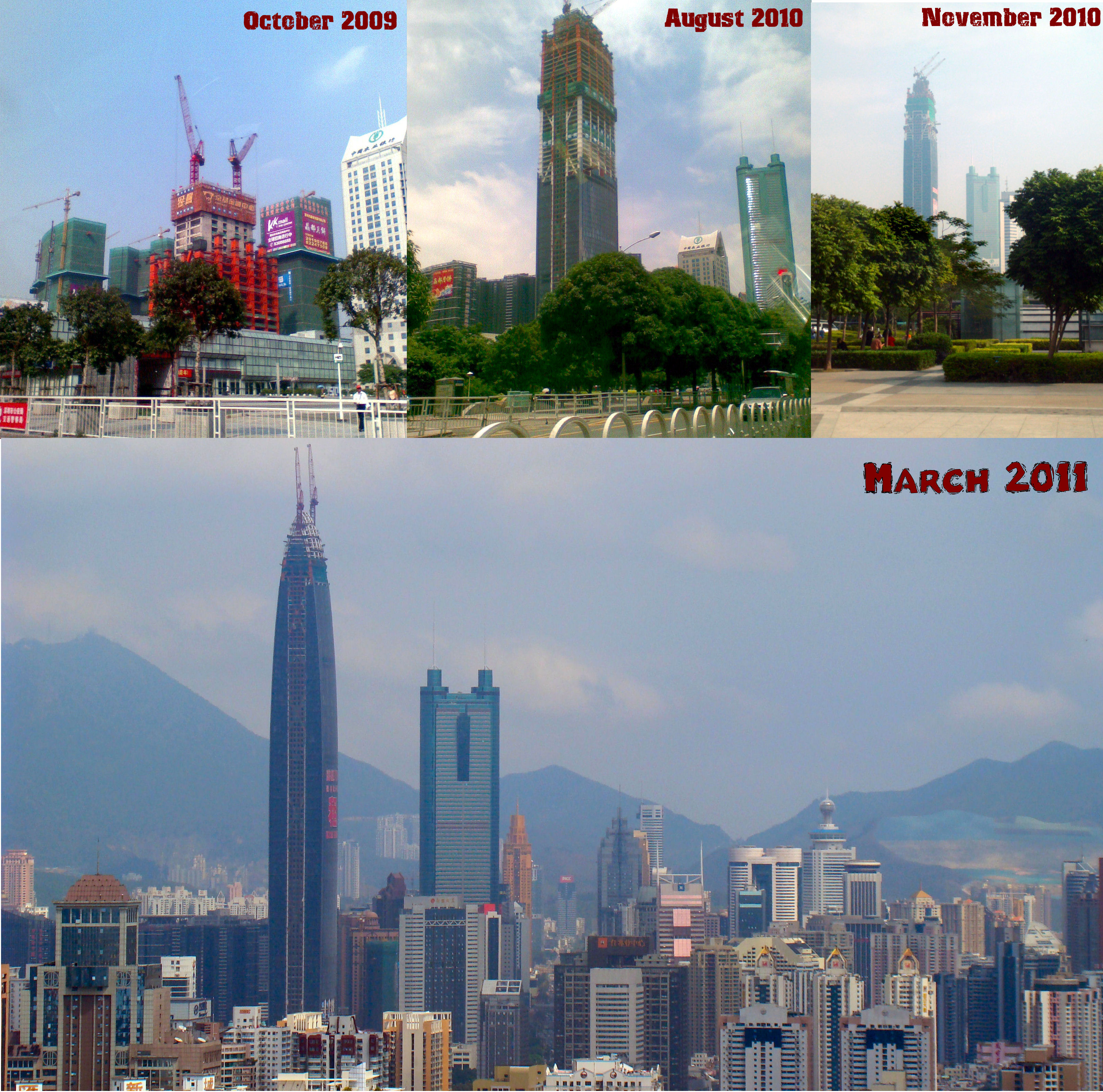
Kingkey Finance Building (with the orange external structure) under construction, 8 October 2009.

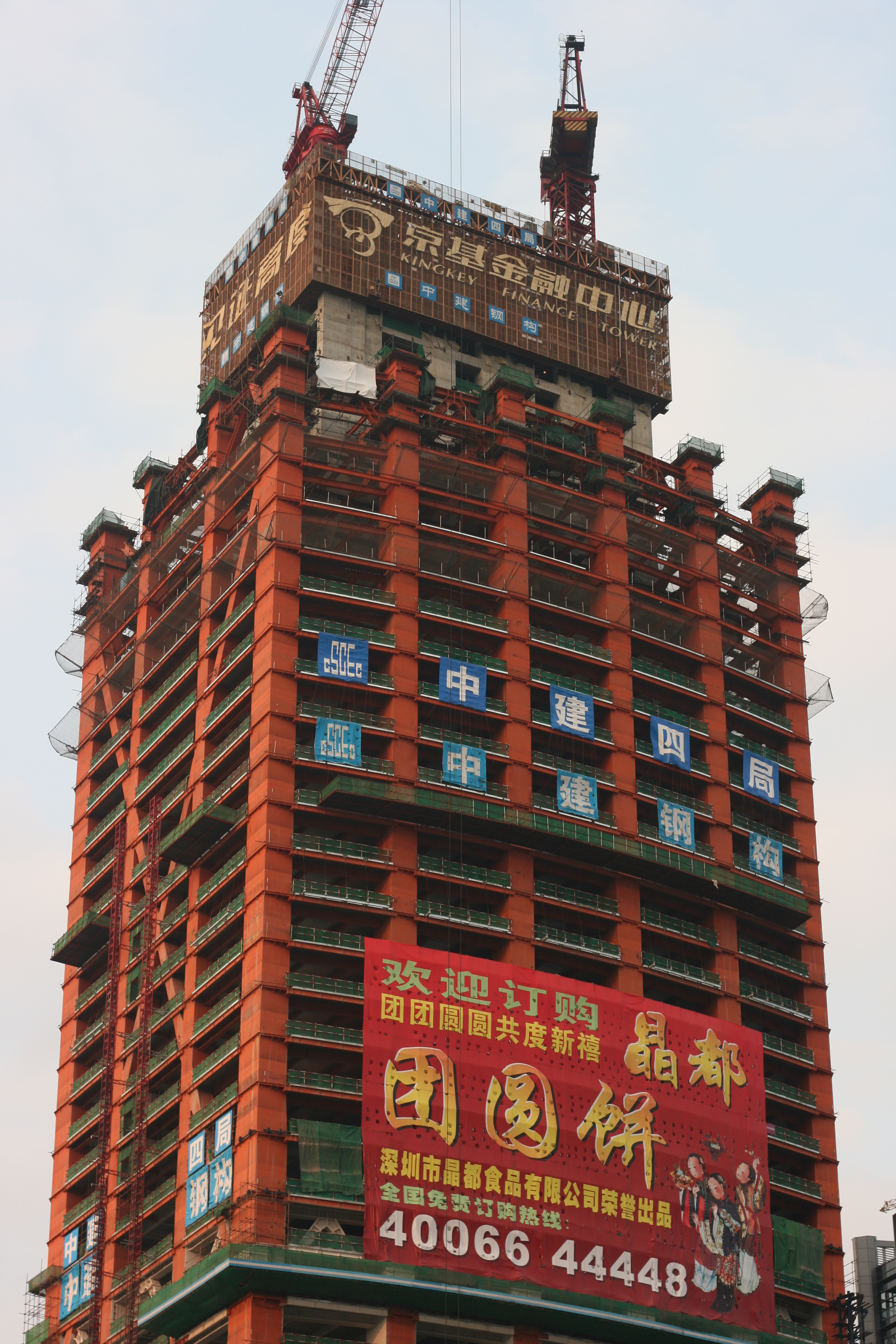
Kingkey Finance Center main tower (with the orange internal structure) under construction, 27 February 2010.

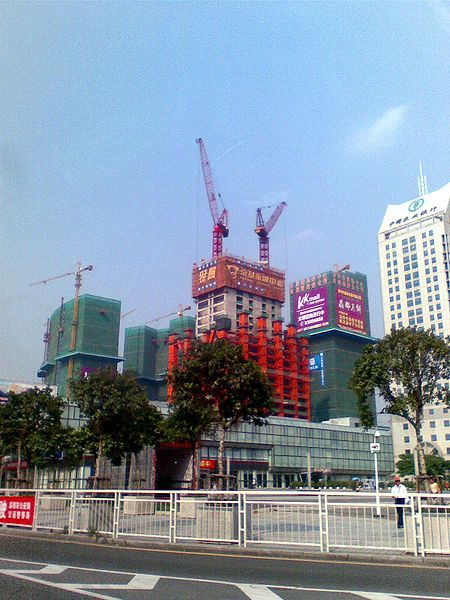
Kingkey Finance Tower under construction in 2009.

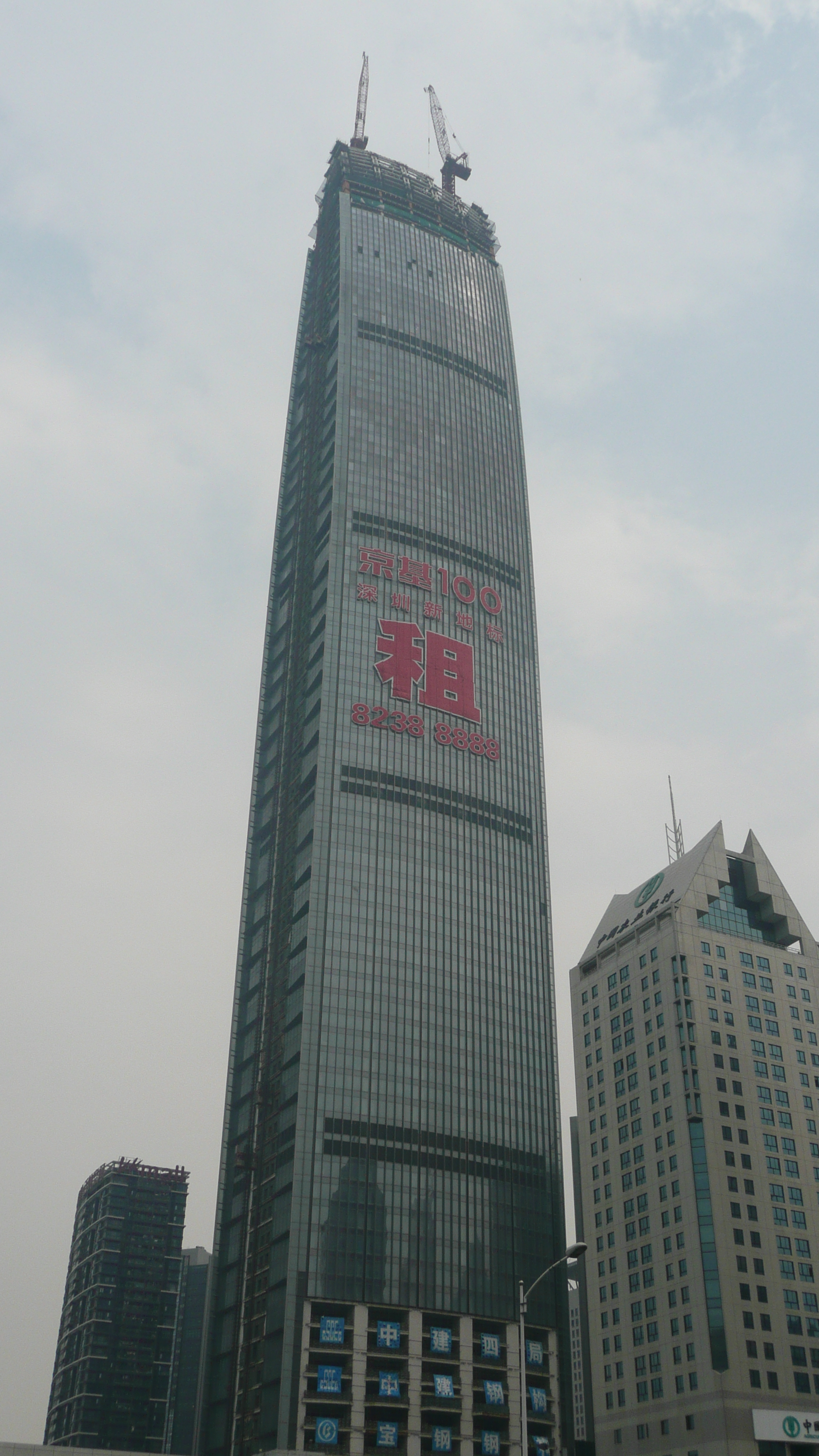
Kingkey 100 under construction.

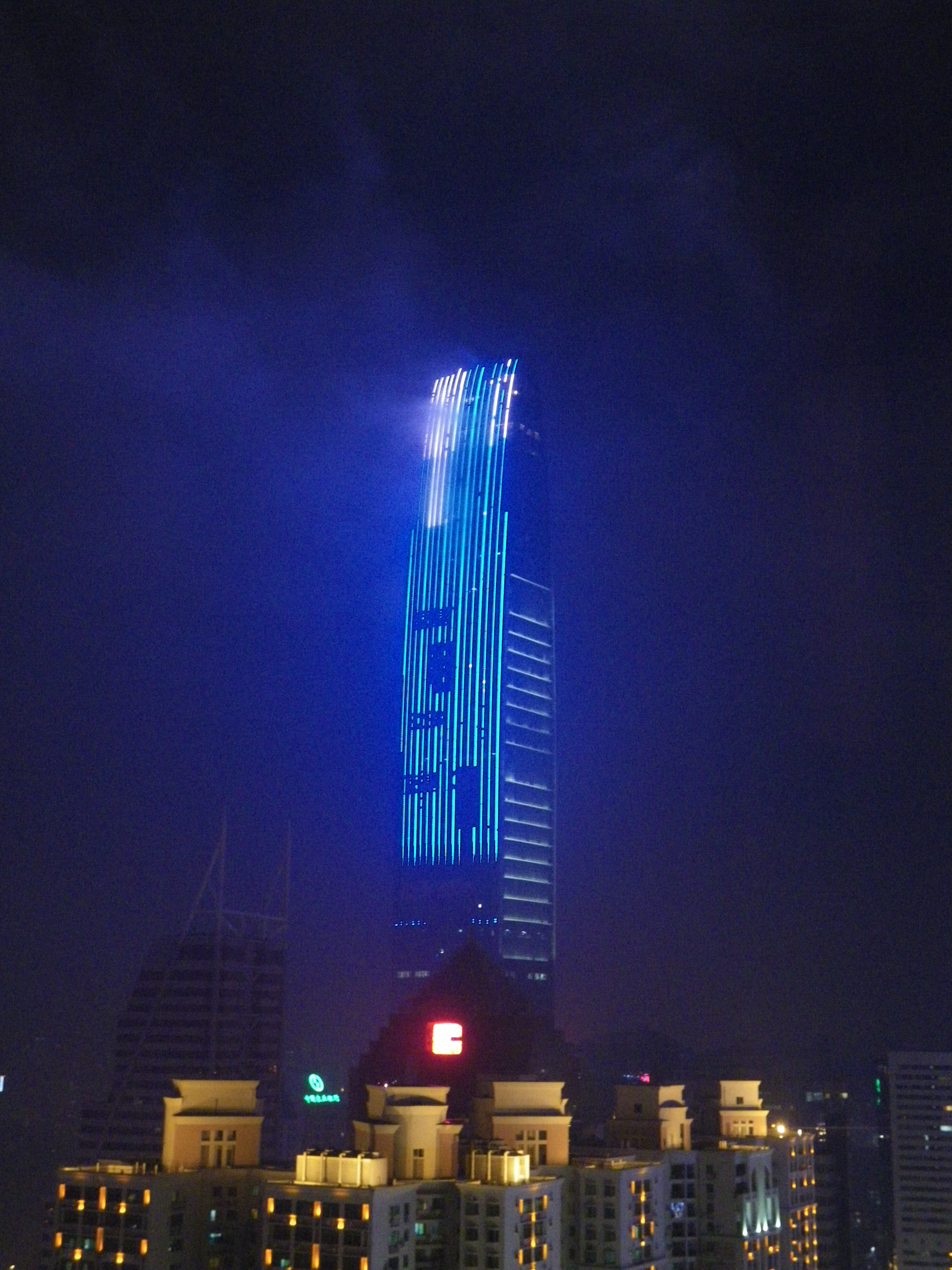
The KK100 building at night, with the top visible through low clouds.

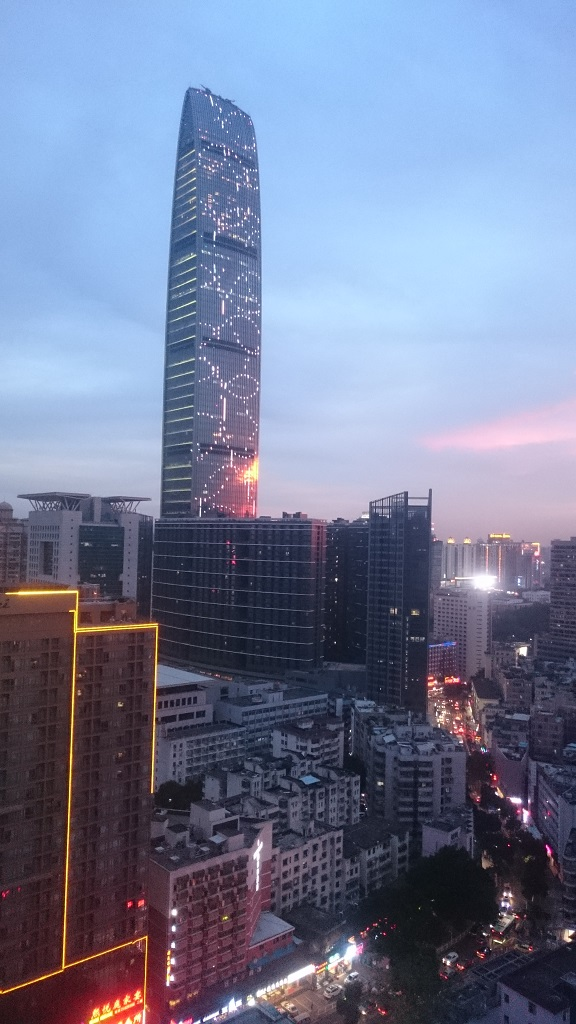
The KK100 at the dawn, 4 June 2016.

== See also ==
- List of tallest buildings in Shenzhen
- List of tallest buildings in China
- List of tallest buildings in the world
- List of buildings with 100 floors or more
