= BEA Finance Tower =

Skyscraper in Shanghai, China

- 东亚银行金融大厦
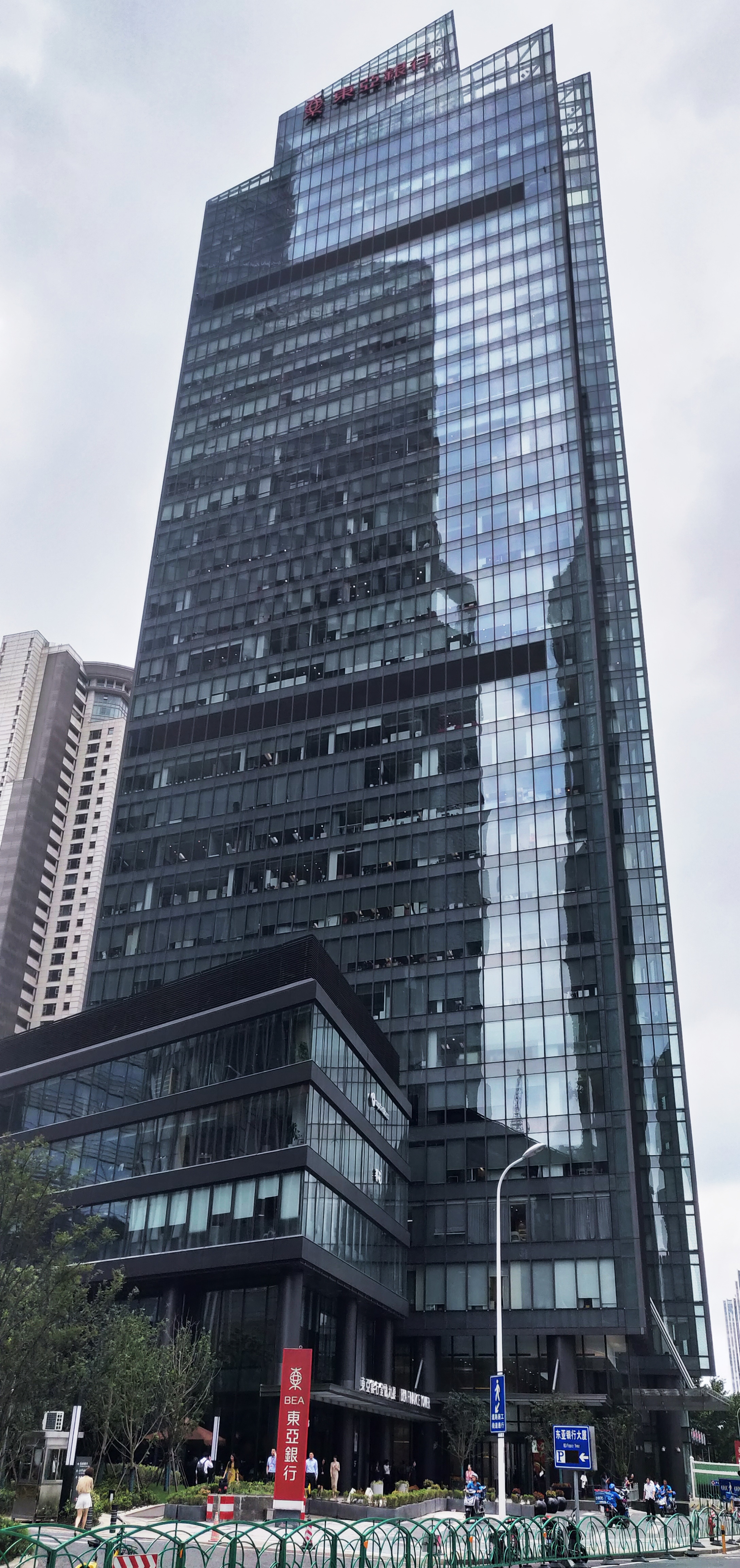
- Interactive map of the BEA Finance Tower area

General information
- Type: Office, restaurants
- Location: Pudong New Area, Shanghai, China
- Coordinates: 31°14′10″N 121°29′53.4″E
- Construction started: 2006
- Completed: 2009

Height
- Roof: 198 m (650 ft)

Technical details
- Floor count: 42 above ground + 3 underground
- Floor area: 75,000 m^{2} (810,000 sq ft) (Above ground)

BEA Finance Tower is a 198-metre skyscraper in Lujiazui, Shanghai. Bank of East Asia locates its mainland China headquarter here, with lower levels for other companies. The building is formerly called Gaobao Finance Tower, but later changed its name at the end of 2008.

On December 9, 2015, The Paper reported that the building was bought by Singapore-based ARA Asset Management for RMB 2.7 billion.

== See also ==
- List of tallest buildings in Shanghai
