= RIAS Doolan Award =

The RIAS Andrew Doolan Best Building in Scotland Award is an annual architecture prize in Scotland. Organised by the Royal Incorporation of Architects in Scotland (RIAS), it was named in memory of the awards founder and patron, Andrew Doolan. Established in 2002, the Doolan Award celebrates the best building in Scotland with eligibility including all types of architectural projects across the country. The architects of the winning building receive the RIAS' Gold Medal. This also included a cash prize through support from the Doolan family and the Scottish Government, with initial winnings of £25,000 making it the ‘richest’ architectural award in the UK. However, as of 2024, the award no longer offers prize money to winners.

== Winners and nominees ==
Year	Winner	Winning work	Nominees and works
2002	Malcolm Fraser Architects	Dance Base, Edinburgh	Richard Murphy - Stirling Tolbooth, Stirling; Munkenbeck & Marshall - Mount Stuart Visitor Centre, Bute; Nicoll Russell Studios - New Byre Theatre, St Andrews; McKeown Alexander Architects - Graham Square Housing, Glasgow
2003	Sutherland Hussey Architects	"An Turas" Ferry Shelter, Tiree	Reiach and Hall Architects - Evolution House, Edinburgh; Arcade Architects - Mossman Houses, Edinburgh; LDN Architects - Kilncraigs Mill Redevelopment, Alloa; Gordon Murray & Alan Dunlop Architects - Radisson SAS Hotel, Glasgow
2004	Elder and Cannon Architects	St Aloysius College's Clavius Building, Glasgow	Frank Gehry - Maggie's Centre, Dundee; Richard Murphy Architects - Eastgate Theatre and Arts Centre, Peebles; Gökay Deveci - Lotte Glob House, Durness, Sutherland
2005	EMBT / RMJM	Scottish Parliament Building, Edinburgh	Gökay Deveci - A' Chrannag, Rothesay; Gareth Hoskins Architects - Community Centre for Health, Partick, Glasgow; Michael Laird Architects - Edinburgh Quay, Union Canal, Edinburgh; Gordon Murray & Alan Dunlop Architects - Sentinel Office Development, Glasgow
2006	Page\Park Architects	Maggie's Centre, Inverness	Malcolm Fraser Architects - Scottish Storytelling Centre, Edinburgh; BDP - Perth Concert Hall, Perth; LDN Architects - St Mary's Metropolitan Cathedral redevelopment, Edinburgh; Gareth Hoskins Architects - The Bridge Arts Centre, Easterhouse, Glasgow; Gordon Murray & Alan Dunlop Architects - JKS Workshops, Clydebank; BDP - The Saltire Centre, Glasgow Caledonian University, Glasgow; BDP - Kelvingrove New Century Project, Glasgow; Paterson Architects - Three Seton Mains, Longniddry; Michael Laird Architects - Royal Bank of Scotland Headquarters, Gogarburn, Edinburgh
2007	Reiach & Hall Architects	Pier Arts Centre, Orkney	Gareth Hoskins Architects - Bridge Arts Centre, Glasgow; Page\Park Architects - Fettes College Sixth Form Building, Edinburgh; Gordon Murray & Alan Dunlop Architects - Hazelwood School, Glasgow; Zaha Hadid Architects - Maggie's Centre, Kirkcaldy; Malcolm Fraser Architects - Princess Gate, Edinburgh; Reiach & Hall Architects - University of St Andrews Arts Faculty Building, St Andrews
2008	Bennetts Associates and Elder & Cannon Architects (joint winners)	Potterrow, Edinburgh and Castlemilk House Stables Block, Glasgow (joint winners)	Gareth Hoskins Architects Ltd - Culloden Battlefield Visitor Centre, Inverness; Studio KAP - Tigh Na Dobhran (single-family dwelling), Argyll; Simpson & Brown Architects - Dawyck Gateway Visitor Centre, Dawyck; Oliver Chapman Architects - Todlaw Supported Housing, Duns; Foster + Partners - Quartermile Development, Edinburgh; Gordon Murray & Alan Dunlop Architects Architects - Telford Drive, Edinburgh; Elder & Cannon Architects - Jordanhill School New Teaching Block, Glasgow; Gray Marshall & Associates - Heart of Hawick, Hawick; Page\Park Architects - Eden Court Theatre, Inverness
2009	Archial Architects	Small Animal Hospital, Glasgow	McKenzie Strickland Associates - Boathouse at Balnearn; Allan Murray Architects - Hotel Missoni, Edinburgh; Malcolm Fraser Architects - Infirmary Street Baths, Edinburgh; Reiach and Hall Architects - New Stobhill Hospital, Glasgow; Elder and Cannon Architects - Niddrie Mill and St Francis Join Primary School, Edinburgh; RMJM - North Glasgow College, Glasgow; Richard Murphy Architects, Elder and Cannon Architects, Page\Park Architects - Social Housing at Moore Street, Glasgow; Cameron Webster Architects - The Printworks, Glasgow; Elder and Cannon Architects - Trongate 103, Glasgow
2010	Elder and Cannon Architects	Shettleston Housing Association Offices, Glasgow	Page\Park Architects - McManus Galleries, Dundee - special mention; Rural Design - 15 Fiscavaig, Isle of Skye; Nicoll Russell Studios - The Briggait Redevelopment, Glasgow; The Pollock Hammond Partnership - The Hippodrome Cinema, Bo'ness; Paterson Architects - House on a Hill, Aberdeenshire; Edward Culling Architects - John Hope Gateway, Edinburgh; Reaich and Hall Architects - Medical & Biological Sciences Building, University of St Andrews; Dualchas Building Design - Raasay Community Hall, Isle of Raasay; Gökay Deveci - Tigh Na Cladach, Dunoon; Anderson Bell + Christie - The West Centre, Glasgow
2011	Gareth Hoskins Architects	The National Museum of Scotland, Edinburgh	Austin-Smith:Lord LLP - 10 Pearce Street, Govan, Glasgow; Richard Gibson Architects - Groedians, Lerwick; Nicoll Russell Studios - Hillcrest Housing Association Headquarters, Dundee; jmarchitects Ltd - Hillhead Primary School, Glasgow; Simon Winstanley Architects Ltd - The Houl, Castle Douglas; Malcolm Fraser Architects: Linlithgow Burgh Halls, Linlithgow; 7N Architects - Phoenix Flowers, Glasgow; SBA Architects Ltd - The Brochs of Coigach, Achiltibuie; Page\Park Architects - Centre for the Scottish War Blinded, Kirknewton; Reiach and Hall Architects - Dundee House, Dundee; Gaia Architects - Glentress Peel Visitor Centre, Peebles; LDN Architects - University of Edinburgh Business School, Edinburgh
2012	OMA	Maggie's Gartnavel, Glasgow	G1 Group - Corinthian Club, Glasgow - special mention; Holmes Miller - Heathfield Primary School, Ayr - special mention; Dualchas Building Design - House at Borreraig, Isle of Skye - special mention; Page\Park Architects - Scottish National Portrait Gallery, Edinburgh - special mention; Rural Design - Bogbain Mill, Lochussie; Cameron Webster Architects - Cape Cove, Shore Road, Helensburgh; Hypostyle Architects - Fore Street, Glasgow; Reiach and Hall Architects - Forth Valley College, Alloa Campus, Alloa; LDN Architects - Heriot's Centre for Sport & Exercise, Edinburgh; Icosis Architects - Loch Leven Bird Hide, Fife; Gökay Deveci - Model 'D' House, Insch; McGregor Bowes + Haworth Tompkins - The Scotsman Steps, Edinburgh; ZONE Architects - Wester Coates House, Edinburgh
2013	NORD Architecture	WASPS South Block, Glasgow	Simpson & Brown Architects - The Chapel of Saint Albert the Great, Edinburgh; Reiach and Hall Architects - Stirling Campus at Forth Valley College, Stirling; Edo Architecture - The Ghost of Water Row, Govan, Glasgow; Schmidt hammer lassen architects - Sir Duncan Rice Library, Aberdeen; Patience & Highmore - Thomas Telford Parliamentary Church, Berneray, North Uist; LDN Architects - The Beacon Arts Centre, Greenock; Fife Council Property Services - Dunfermline High School, Dunfermline; Cameron-Webster Architects - House, Lenzie; studioKAP - 4 Linsiadar, Isle of Lewis; Gareth Hoskins Architects - Mareel, Lerwick; Rural Design - The Turf House, Isle of Skye
2014	Morgan McDonnell Architecture Ltd	Advocates Close, Edinburgh	Robin Baker Architects - The Birks Cinema, Aberfeldy; Denizen Works Ltd - House No. 7, Isle of Tiree; GLM - The Inn at John O’Groats, Caithness; Reiach & Hall Architects - Scottish Water Office, The Bridge, Stepps; Elder and Cannon Architects - 261 West Princes Street, Glasgow; BDP - Buchanan Gardens, Glasgow; Dualchas Architects - Cliff House, Isle of Skye; Elder and Cannon Architects - Clydebank East Workshops, Clydebank; RMJM - Commonwealth Games Athletes’ Village, Glasgow; Gareth Hoskins Architects - Grassmarket Community Project, Edinburgh; LDN Architects - Knockando Woolmill, Knockando; Foster + Partners - The SSE Hydro, Glasgow
2015	Sutherland Hussey Harris	West Burn Lane, St Andrews	Malcolm Fraser Architects - Arcadia Nursery, Edinburgh; Page\Park Architects - Laurieston Transformational Area, Glasgow; Page\Park Architects - Theatre Royal, Glasgow
2016	Page\Park Architects	Saunders Centre, Science & Technology Building, Glasgow	
2017	Richard Murphy Architects	Dunfermline Carnegie Library & Galleries	Ann Nisbet Studio - Newhouse of Auchengree, North Ayrshire; Reiach and Hall Architects, Michael Laird Architects - City Campus at City of Glasgow College, Glasgow; Hoskins Architects - Rockvilla at the National Theatre of Scotland, Glasgow; JM Architects, Oberlander Architects - James Gillespies's Campus, Edinburgh; Glasgow City Council - Glendale Primary School, Glasgow; Carson and Partners - Powis Place, Aberdeen; Somner MacDonald Architects - Moray Place, Edinburgh; Scampton and Barnett Architects - Fernaig Cottage, Wester Ross; Cameron Webster Architects - Due West
2018	Reiach & Hall Architects	Nucleus, The Nuclear Decommissioning Authority and Caithness Archive, Wick	
2019	Rogers Stirk Harbour + Partners	The Macallan Distillery and Visitor Experience	
2020	Award postponed due to COVID-19 pandemic		
2021	Hoskins Architects	Aberdeen Art Gallery	Bennetts Associates - Bayes Centre, Edinburgh; Oliver Chapman Architects - The Egg Shed, Ardrishaig; Carmody Groarke - The Hill House Box, Helensburgh; Reiach and Hall Architects - National Sports Training Centre Inverclyde, Largs
2022	Moxon Architects	Quarry Studios, Aberdeenshire	Reiach and Hall Architects - Falkirk Campus at Forth Valley College, Falkirk; Loader Monteith - High Sunderland, Galashiels; Stallan-Brand - Jedburgh Grammar Campus, Jedburgh; Konishi Gaffney - Lockerbie Sawmill, Lockerbie
2023	Ann Nisbet Studio	Cuddymoss, North Ayrshire	Page\Park Architects - Campus Central at the University of Stirling, Stirling; Denizen Works - Hundred Acre Wood, Argyll and Bute; Flanagan Lawrence - Laidlaw Music Centre at the University of St Andrews, St Andrews
2024	John McAslan + Partners	The Burrell Collection, Glasgow	Moxon Architects - Ardoch House, Aberdeenshire; Page\Park Architects - North Gate Social Housing, Glasgow; Reiach and Hall Architects - The Fruitmarket Gallery, Edinburgh; Reiach and Hall Architects - Science Teaching Hub at University of Aberdeen, Aberdeen
2025	Stallan-Brand Architecture + Design, LDA Design	Union Terrace Gardens, Aberdeen	Simpson & Brown - Fairburn Tower, Muir of Ord, Highlands; Moxon Architects - Gairnshiel Jubilee Bridge, Glengairn, Aberdeenshire; Sheppard Robson - The Nucleus Building at the University of Edinburgh, Edinburgh

== See also ==
- List of architecture prizes
- RIBA Stirling Prize
