= Prospect 100 best modern Scottish buildings =

In 2005, the Scottish architecture magazine Prospect published a list of the 100 best modern Scottish buildings, as voted for by its readers.

| | Building | Location | Year of completion | Architect/Engineer |
|---|---|---|---|---|
| 1 | St Peter's Seminary | Cardross, Argyll | 1967 | Gillespie, Kidd & Coia |
| 2 | Burrell Collection | Glasgow | 1983 | Sir Barry Gasson |
| 3 | St Aloysius' Junior School | Glasgow | 1998 | Elder and Cannon |
| 4 | Scottish Parliament Building | Edinburgh | 2004 | EMBT/RMJM |
| 5 | Bernat Klein Studio | Near Selkirk | 1972 | Peter Womersley |
| 6 | St Bride's RC Church | East Kilbride | 1963 | Gillespie, Kidd & Coia |
| 7 | National Museum of Rural Life | East Kilbride | 2001 | Page\Park Architects |
| 8 | Scottish Provident building | St Andrew Square, Edinburgh | 1969 | Rowand Anderson Kininmonth and Paul |
| 9 | Scottish Poetry Library | Edinburgh | 1999 | Malcolm Fraser |
| 10 | SAS Radisson Hotel | Argyle Street, Glasgow | 2003 | Gordon Murray & Alan Dunlop Architects |
| 11 | Evolution House | Edinburgh | 2004 | Reaich and Hall |
| 12 | Andrew Melville Hall | St Andrews | 1967 | James Stirling |
| 13 | Dundee Contemporary Arts | Dundee | 1999 | Richard Murphy |
| 14 | Museum of Scotland | Edinburgh | 1999 | Benson & Forsyth |
| 15 | United Distillers | Edinburgh | 1986 | RMJM |
| 16 | Kelso Group Practice | Kelso | 1974 | Peter Womersley |
| 17 | Morris House Fala | Midlothian | 1970 | Morris and Steedman |
| 18 | Edinburgh Airport | Edinburgh | 1954 | RMJM |
| 19 | Royal Commonwealth Pool | Edinburgh | 1970 | RMJM |
| 20 | Dancebase | Edinburgh | 2002 | Malcolm Fraser |
| 21 | Maggie's Edinburgh | Edinburgh | 1998 | Richard Murphy |
| 22 | Mortonhall Crematorium | Edinburgh | 1967 | Basil Spence |
| 23 | Our Lady of Good Counsel | Dennistoun, Glasgow | | Gillespie, Kidd & Coia |
| 24 | St Paul's RC Church | Glenrothes | 1957 | Gillespie, Kidd & Coia |
| 25 | St Aloysius' College Clavius Building | Glasgow | 2004 | Elder and Cannon |
| 26 | BOAC building | Buchanan Street, Glasgow | 1970 | Gillespie, Kidd & Coia |
| 27 | Mount Stuart visitor centre | Isle of Bute | 2001 | Mukenbeck and Marshall |
| 28 | Fruitmarket Gallery | Edinburgh | 1991 | Richard Murphy |
| 29 | Plant houses Royal Botanic Garden Edinburgh | Edinburgh | 1967 | Property Services Agency with LR Creasy |
| 30 | Avisfield House | Cramond, Edinburgh | 1952 | Morris and Steedman |
| 31 | Snodgrass house | Silverburn, Midlothian | 1964 | Morris and Steedman |
| 32 | Killoch Colliery | Killoch, Ayrshire | 1953 | Egon Riss |
| 33 | Cummins Factory | Shotts | 1980 | Ahrends, Burton and Koralek |
| 34 | Grianan Building | Dundee Technology Park | 1986 | Nicoll Russell Studio |
| 35 | Point Conference Centre | Edinburgh | 2001 | Andrew Doolan |
| 36 | University of Stirling | Stirling | 1967–1974 | RMJM |
| 37 | BT building | Edinburgh Park | 1998 | Bennetts Associates |
| 38 | Tramway | Glasgow | 2000 | Zoo Architects |
| 39 | Sentinel | Glasgow | 2005 | gm+ad |
| 40 | Loch Lomond National Park Visitor centre | Balloch | 2001 | Bennetts Associates |
| 41 | Dollan Baths | East Kilbride | 1968 | Alexander Buchanan Campbell |
| 42 | Sillitto House | Charterhall Road, Edinburgh | 1959 | Morris and Steedman |
| 43 | Rodger House | Edinburgh | 1961 | Morris and Steedman |
| 44 | Principal's House | Stirling University | 1967 | Morris and Steedman |
| 45 | Cockenzie power station | Cockenzie and Port Seton | 1967 | RMJM |
| 46 | Dundee Repertory Theatre | Dundee | 1982 | Nicoll Russell Studios |
| 47 | Forth Road Bridge | Fife / Edinburgh | 1964 | Mott, Hay and Anderson and Freeman, Fox and Partners |
| 48 | Kylesku Bridge | Sutherland | 1985 | Arup |
| 49 | Eden Court Theatre | Inverness | 1976 | Law and Dunbar-Nasmith |
| 50 | New Club, Edinburgh | Princes Street, Edinburgh | 1966 | Alan Reiach |
| 51 | Maggie's Glasgow | Glasgow | 2003 | Page\Park Architects |
| 52 | Maggie's Dundee | Dundee | 2004 | Frank Gehry and Fred Stephens |
| 53 | Maggie's Inverness | Inverness | 2005 | Page\Park Architects |
| 54 | Anderston Centre | Glasgow | 1972 | Richard Seifert Company & Partnership |
| 55 | The Drum Phase 3 | Bo'ness | 2004 | Malcolm Fraser |
| 56 | Pennycook Court | Perth Road, Dundee | 1986 | Page\Park Architects |
| 57 | Dick Place | Edinburgh | 2003 | Andrew Doolan |
| 58 | Potterrow Student Centre | University of Edinburgh | 1973 | Morris and Steedman |
| 59 | Homes for the Future | Glasgow Green | 1999 | Elder and Cannon |
| 60 | Homes for the Future | Glasgow Green | 1999 | McKeown Alexander |
| 61 | Tron Housing | Fishmarket Close, Edinburgh | | Richard Murphy |
| 62 | Graham Square | Gallowgate, Glasgow | 2000 | McKeown Alexander |
| 63 | Bell House | Milton of Campsie | 2004 | NORD |
| 64 | Private house | Ross | 2004 | Brennan and Wilson |
| 65 | Tron Theatre reworking | Glasgow | 1998 | RMJM |
| 66 | Lotte Glob House | Sutherland | 2004 | Gokay Devici |
| 67 | Youth Hostel | Torridon | 1975 | Moira & Moira |
| 68 | Archaeolink | Aberdeenshire | 1998 | Edward Cullinan |
| 69 | Round and Square Towers | The Robert Gordon University | 1993 | Dixon Jones |
| 70 | Queens Tower Building | University of Dundee | 1961 | RMJM |
| 71 | The Italian Centre | Glasgow | 1992 | Page\Park Architects |
| 72 | Crown Street 2a | Gorbals | 2002 | Page\Park Architects |
| 73 | Crown Street 3a | Gorbals | 2002 | Elder and Cannon |
| 74 | An Turas | Tiree | 2003 | Sutherland Hussey |
| 75 | Waddell House | Pollokshields, Glasgow | 2003 | Studio Kap |
| 76 | Brunswick Hotel | Glasgow | 1986 | Elder and Cannon |
| 77 | Institute for Health Sciences | Strathclyde University | 1998 | Reiach and Hall |
| 78 | Spectrum House | Glasgow | 2002 | gm+ad |
| 79 | Dean Gallery | Edinburgh | 1999 | Terry Farrell and Partners |
| 80 | New Byres Theatre | St Andrews | 2002 | Nicoll Russell |
| 81 | Succoth Heights | Edinburgh | 2003 | Reiach and Hall |
| 82 | Glasgow College of Building and Printing | Glasgow | 1964 | Wylie, Shanks and Underwood |
| 83 | Jack Kilby Centre, Napier University | Edinburgh | 2003 | Richard Murphy |
| 84 | 120 West Regent Street | Glasgow | 1990 | Glass and Murray |
| 85 | Ronaldson's Wharf | Edinburgh | 2003 | Dignan Read Dewar and Fraser Brown McKenna |
| 86 | Cowgate under 5s | Edinburgh | | Allan Murray Architects |
| 87 | Wolfson Medical School Building | University of Glasgow | 2002 | Reiach and Hall |
| 88 | Loch Arthur housing | Beeswing, Dumfries | 2002 | Crallan and Winstanley |
| 89 | Icon Building | Glasgow | 2004 | Elder and Cannon |
| 90 | A'Chrannag Rothesay | Isle of Bute | 2004 | Gokay Devici |
| 91 | Princes Square | Glasgow | 1987 | Hugh Martin Partnership |
| 92 | Spa One | Edinburgh | 2003 | Terry Farrell and Partners |
| 93 | Scottish Widows | Morrison Street, Edinburgh | 1998 | Building Design Partnership |
| 94 | Lanark County Buildings | Hamilton | 1964 | D G Bannerman |
| 95 | Saltire Court | Edinburgh | 1991 | Cambell and Arnott |
| 96 | Scottish Amicable Head Office | St Vincent Street, Glasgow | 1979 | King Main Ellison |
| 97 | Woodside Housing Phase 3 | Glasgow | 1970 | Boswell Mitchell and Johnson |
| 98 | The Barlas House | Edinburgh | 2003 | Zone Architects |
| 99 | City Travel Inn - Phase 2 | Edinburgh | 1999 | Andrew Doolan |
| 100 | Cumbernauld Town Centre Phase 1 | Cumbernauld | 1963–67 | Geoffrey Copcutt |

== See also ==
- DoCoMoMo Key Scottish Monuments
