= Page\Park Architects =

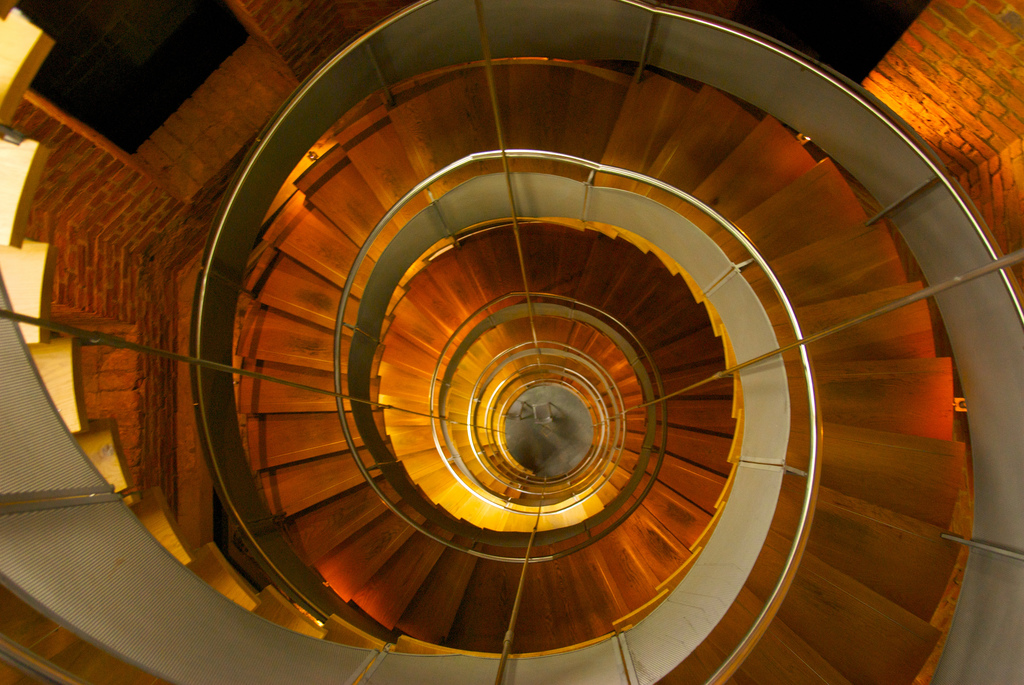
- The Lighthouse, Glasgow

Practice information
- Key architects: David Page Brian Park
- Founded: 1981
- Location: Glasgow, Scotland

Significant works and honors
- Buildings: The Lighthouse (Glasgow)
- Awards: 2006 RIAS Andrew Doolan Award for Architecture

Website
- http://www.pagepark.co.uk

Page\Park Architects is a Scottish architectural company established in 1981, by David Page and Brian Park.

With over 150 national and international design awards since its inception in 1981, Page/Park has won the Carbon Trust Award in Scotland twice, and has been shortlisted for the RIAS Andrew Doolan Award for Architecture four times, winning once in 2006 for the Maggie's Centre Highlands and receiving a Special Commendation in 2010 for the McManus Galleries.

In 2005, the Scottish architecture magazine Prospect published a list of the 100 best modern Scottish buildings, as voted for by its readers, which featured six Page\Park projects.

In 2010, Page\Park were 93rd in the Architects' Journal top 100 architectural practices in the United Kingdom. In 2014 they had risen to 71 and had won the AJ100 Best Place to Work Award 2014. In December 2013 they became an employee owned business.

Following the 2018 fire which largely destroyed Charles Rennie Mackintosh's Glasgow School of Art building, Page\Park received press attention and criticism from Members of the Scottish Parliament for their role in its restoration.

== Notable projects ==
=== Completed projects ===
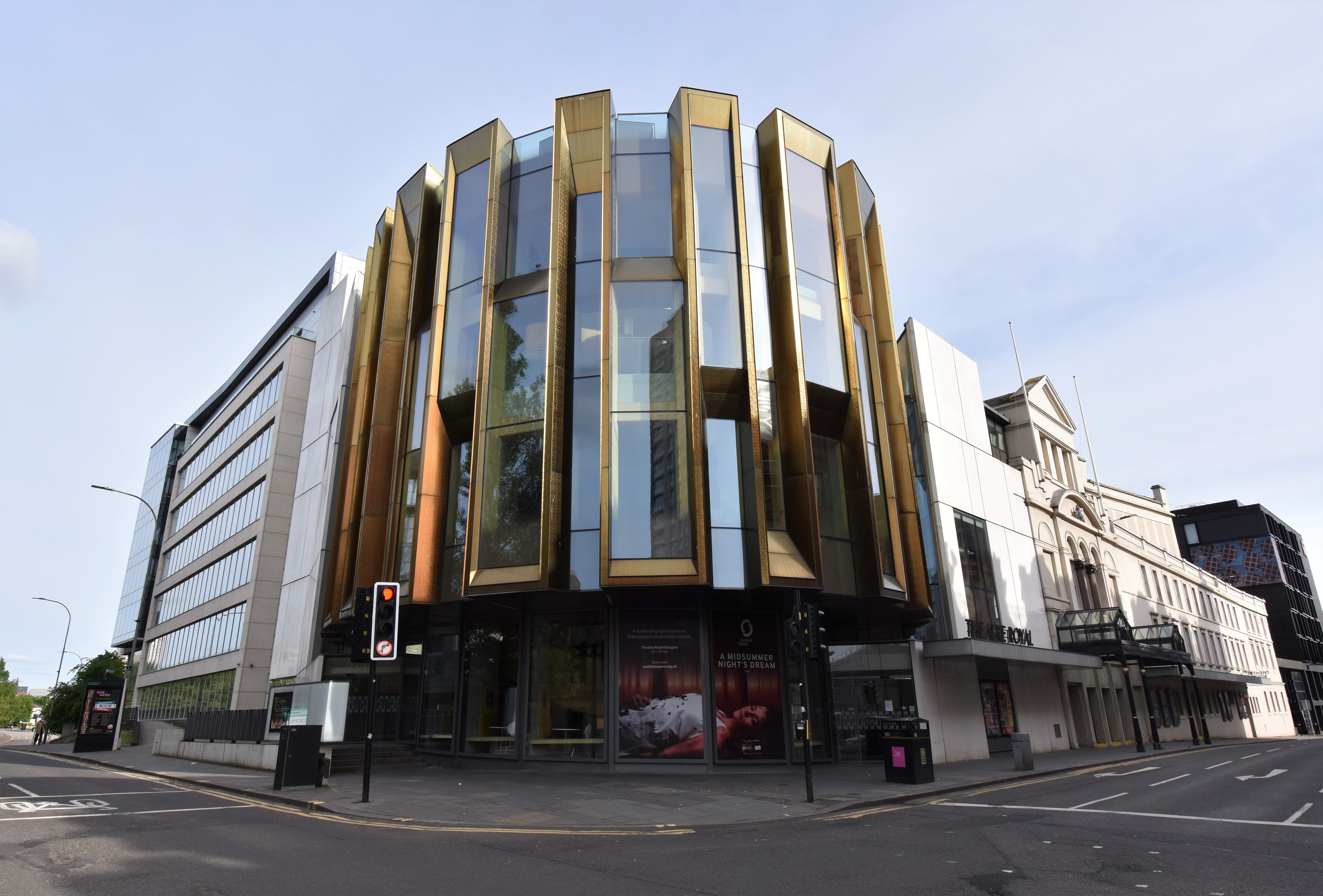
Glasgow. Theatre Royal. Foyer, 2014

- The Lighthouse, Glasgow, Scotland
- Maggie's Centre, Inverness, Scotland
- Maggie's Centre, Glasgow, Scotland
- National Museum of Rural Life
- Rowardennan Field station, Scotland
- Aqualibrium Campbeltown, Kintyre, Scotland
- Gorbals housing, Glasgow, Scotland
- Eden Court Theatre, Inverness, Scotland
- Carnegie United Kingdom Trust Headquarters, Scotland
- 1967-1969 Dumbarton Road, Glasgow, Scotland
- Fettes Prep School, Edinburgh, Scotland
- Loch Lomond and the Trossachs Headquarters, Scotland
- Fraser Building, Glasgow, Scotland
- Linburn Centre, Wilkieston, West Lothian
- McManus Galleries, Dundee
- Bluebell Views Student Residences, University of Warwick, England
- Rosslyn Chapel, Scotland
- Olympia Theatre, Bridgeton, Scotland
- Theatre Royal Extension, Glasgow
- The West End Medical Practice, West End, Edinburgh.

=== Ongoing and future projects ===
- Scottish Power Headquarters, Glasgow
- Kelvin Hall Redevelopment, Glasgow
- Laurieston Housing Development, Glasgow
- Refurbishment of the David Hume Tower, Edinburgh

== Awards (since 2006) ==
=== 2006 ===
- RIBA Awards - Maggie's Centre Highlands
- Glasgow Institute of Architects Award - Maggie's Centre Highlands
- Glasgow Institute of Architects - Commendation - Friary Court, Gorbals
- Copper in Architecture Awards 12 : UK Architectural Design Award - Commended - Maggie's Centre Highlands
- Craftsmanship Award - Maggie's Centre Highlands
- International Architecture Award awarded by the Chicago Athenaeum - Maggie's Centre Highlands
- Scottish Design Awards : Northern Exposure category - Maggie's Centre, Highlands
- Andrew Doolan Scottish Building of the Year Award - Maggie's Centre, Highlands
- RICS Scotland sustainability Award - Queen Mother Building, Dundee
- Scottish Design Award Commendation - Queen Mother Building, Dundee
- INCA (Supreme Award) - Queen Mother Building, Dundee
- Dundee Civic Trust Award - Queen Mother Building, Dundee
- Dundee Institute of Architects Award - Commendation - Queen Mother Building, Dundee

=== 2007 ===
- Scottish Awards for Planning - Aqualibrium, Campbeltown
- Civic Trust Award - Aqualibrium, Campbeltown
- Scottish Design Award - Aqualibrium, Campbeltown
- Carbon Trust Low Carbon Building Award - University Field Station, Rowardennan
- RICS Scotland sustainability Award - Commendation - University Field Station, Rowardennan
- Scottish Design Award Commendation - University Field Station, Rowardennan
- Green Apple Sustainability Award - University Field Station, Rowardennan
- BIFM Award, New Build Category - University Field Station, Rowardennan

=== 2008 ===
- Scottish Design Awards:Best Re-use of a Listed Building - Commendation - Eden Court Theatre
- IAA Award Commendation Best New Building, Highlands & Islands - Eden Court Theatre
- RICS Scotland Community Benefit Award - Eden Court Theatre
- GIA Award – Sustainability - Eden Court Theatre
- GIA Award – Leisure - Eden Court Theatre
- Saltire Society Housing Design Award - Waddell Street/Ballater Street
- CIOB Scotland Good Building Award - Waddell Street/Ballater Street
- GIA Award Residential - Commendation - Dumbarton Road, Yoker
- GIA Award Office/Commercial - Andrew Carnegie House, Dunfermline
- Scottish Award for Quality in Planning - Carrochan, Balloch
- Natural Stone Award - Carrochan, Balloch
- NFRC Roofing Award - Carrochan, Balloch

=== 2009 ===
- Carbon Trust, Low Carbon Building Award - Carrochan, Balloch
- British Council for Offices Award 2009 – Carrochan, Balloch
- Regional Winner British Council for Offices Award 2009 – Carrochan, Balloch
- National Winner RIBA GAI Sustainability Award - Carrochan, Balloch
- RICS Scotland Sustainability Award (high commendation) - Carrochan, Balloch
- Scottish Design Awards 2009, Engineering Design Award - Carrochan, Balloch
- Scottish Design Awards 2009, Best Public Building - Commendation - Carrochan, Balloch
- Scottish Design Awards 2009, Sustainability Award – Commendation - Carrochan, Balloch
- ACE Engineering Excellence Awards 2009 – Building Services Award - Carrochan, Balloch
- Roses Design Awards 2009 – Silver Award, Engineering Design Category - Carrochan, Balloch
- GIA Award 2009 – Public Building Category - Fettes College Prep School
- RIBA Award 2009 - Moore Street Housing
- Scottish Design Award 2009 – Moore Street Housing
- Roses Design Awards 2009 – Moore Street Housingory
- GIA Award 2009 – Housing Category - Moore Street Housing

=== 2010 ===
- Civic Trust Award 2010 – Commendation Fraser Building, University of Glasgow
- Civic Trust Award 2010 – Commendation Carrochan, Balloch
- RICS Award Highly Commended Conservation McManus Galleries, Dundee
- Andy Doolan Award 2010 – Special mention - McManus Galleries, Dundee
- Dundee Institute of Architects Awards McManus Galleries, Dundee 2010, Winner - Best Regeneration/Conservation Project
- Dundee Institute of Architects Awards McManus Galleries, Dundee 2010, Winner - Best Interior Design
- Dundee Institute of Architects Awards McManus Galleries, Dundee 2010, Winner - Best Public/Commercial Project
- Dundee Institute of Architects Awards McManus Galleries, Dundee 2010, Winner of the Supreme Award
- Dundee Civic Trust Award 2010 McManus Galleries, Dundee
- Glasgow Institute of Architects Awards McManus Galleries, Dundee 2010, Winner Conservation Award 2010
- Saltire Society Engineering Awards, 2010 – Conservation Award Commendation McManus Galleries, Dundee

=== 2011 ===
- AJ 100 Best Practice in Scotland Page \ Park Architects
- Civic Trust Award 2011 for Conservation, McManus Galleries, Dundee
- Civic Trust Award 2011: Special Award for Restoration and Refurbishment, McManus Galleries, Dundee
- Scottish Design Awards 2011, Conservation McManus Galleries, Dundee
- Scottish Design Awards 2011, Public Realm Albert Square, Dundee
- RIBA Award 2011 McManus Galleries, Dundee
- RIBA Award 2011 Centre for Scottish War Blinded, Linburn
- Scottish Design Award 2011, Commendation – Engineering Design, Centre for Scottish War Blinded, Linburn
- GIA Design Award, Conservation St. Andrews Cathedral, Glasgow
- GIA Design Award, Small Projects St. Paul's Church, Shettleston
- GIA Design Award, Healthcare Centre for Scottish War Blinded, Linburn
- West Lothian Council Good Access Award Centre for Scottish War Blinded, Linburn

=== 2012 ===
- AJ 100 Best Practice in Scotland - Page \ Park Architects
- Scottish Design Awards Practice of the Year Award - Page \ Park Architects
- RICS Award 2012, Conservation Category - St Andrew's Cathedral
- RICS Award 2012, Innovation and Technology Category - Centre for Scottish War Blinded
- RICS Building of the Year Award 2012 Centre for Scottish War Blinded
- Scottish Design Awards 2012 Leisure /Culture Building, Scottish National Portrait Gallery
- Scottish War Blinded Centre, Linburn RICS Award 2012 – Building of The Year Award
- RIAS Award 2012 Scottish National Portrait Gallery
- RIBA Award 2012 Scottish National Portrait Gallery
- GIA Conservation Award Scottish National Portrait Gallery
- Special Mention for the Andy Doolan Award Scottish National Portrait Gallery
- Civic Trust Highly Commended Fair Maid's House
- GIA Commendation Fair Maid's House
- Perth Civic Trust Award Fair Maid's House
- Carbon Trust Low Carbon Building Award Scottish National Portrait Gallery

=== 2013 ===
- AJ 100 Best Place to Work Award Page \ Park Architects
- RICS Scotland Awards 2013, Building Conservation Award, Scottish National Portrait Gallery
- RICS Scotland Awards 2013, Scotland Project of the Year Award, Scottish National Portrait Gallery
- RICS West Midlands Awards 2013, Bluebell Views, Residential Category
- Lighting Design Awards 2013, Highly Commended in Public Buildings category, Scottish National Portrait Gallery
- UK Property Award 2013 Scottish National Portrait Gallery
- Civic Trust Award Scottish National Portrait Gallery

=== 2014 ===
- AJ 100 Employer of the Year Award 2014 Page \ Park Architects
- GIA Conservation Award 2014 Kelvingrove Bandstand
- Glasgow Herald Property Awards 2014 Kelvingrove Bandstand
- GIA Education Award 2014-Commendation 50 George Square

=== 2016 ===
- RIAS Andrew Doolan Best Building in Scotland Award
