= Morris and Steedman =

Architecture firm

Morris and Steedman was an architecture firm based in Edinburgh, Scotland. The firm was founded by James Shepherd Morris (1931–2006) and Robert Russell Steedman (1929–2026) in the 1950s. The pair are best known for their private houses in the modernist style, built during the 1950s and 1960s, described as "arguably the most important series of 20th century houses by a single practice in Scotland". Both founders retired in 2002, although their practice continues as Morris and Steedman Associates.

Several of their buildings are now listed, and seven of their works were included on the list of 100 best modern Scottish buildings published by Prospect magazine in 2005.

== Architects ==
James Morris met Robert Steedman while the two were studying together at Edinburgh College of Art (ECA). Encouraged by their tutor, Ian McHarg, the two went on to complete a Master of Liberal Arts course in landscape architecture at the University of Pennsylvania in Philadelphia. Here, under the guidance of Philip Johnson, they absorbed the ideas of architects such as Ludwig Mies van der Rohe, Marcel Breuer, Richard Neutra, and the "Case Study Houses" of California. Both architects were elected associates of the Royal Institute of British Architects (RIBA) in 1955; they joined in partnership, based in Edinburgh in 1957.

== Buildings ==
They obtained their first commission from Steedman's dentist in 1952, while still in their final year at ECA. The resulting house, "Avisfield", at Cramond (1957) was listed at category B in 2007, as "one of the first modern-movement houses to be built in Scotland". Their second house, at Kevock Road, Lasswade, was built on a narrow site above the River North Esk. The narrow site required the building to be cantilevered over the slope. The Sillito House on Blackford Hill followed in 1959, with the main living space placed on the first floor to take advantage of views across Edinburgh. By 1970 around 15 houses had been completed, including Morris' own house at Fala (1970), and Steedman's in Ravelston (1960), as well as the Principal's House at the University of Stirling (1967), which was listed at category A in 2009.

A full list of Morris and Steedman clients and projects is available from the successor practice's website. Although best known and celebrated for their early private houses, this list demonstrates the wide range of clients Morris and Steedman and their successor practice worked for over the years and the diversity of types of projects undertaken.

Perhaps one of the best known of their education projects is the B-listed Wolfson Centre for Bioengineering (1969–72), the University of Strathclyde, situated at Taylor Street (106 Rottenrow), Glasgow. This five-storey building, including laboratories and teaching spaces, has full-height ribbed chevron-shaped concrete cladding panels and is a prominent landmark on the campus. According to the listing, services were integrated into the architecture and housed in the chevron cladding. Another example of Brutalist Modernist work is the University of Edinburgh Student Centre at Potterrow, actually built in phases and originally including 6 & 7 Bristo Square as well as the current student union facilities at 1-5 Bristo Square; the dome at Potterrow was phase III (1966–73). In 2009 the University of Edinburgh contributed to a master plan published by the city council suggesting these buildings are likely to be removed. However, the buildings at 7 Bristo Square have been refurbished and extended by the University of Edinburgh at a cost of £8m to form a Wellbeing Centre (2018-2020).

The Countryside Commission for Scotland (now Scottish Natural Heritage) centre at Battleby, Perth (1971), was by contrast a conservation project and involved rebuilding a ruined farmstead. This project was awarded a RIBA award in 1974 and a Civic Trust Award in 1975. The Dalmeny Tank farm project earned a European Architecture Heritage Year award in 1975, and that for Braefoot Mossmoran in Fife a European Heritage Business and Industry award in 1985.

Their extension to the Princess Margaret Rose Hospital in Edinburgh (1966) was demolished after a fire in 2002.

== Sources ==
- "Architects Volume 1: Morris and Steedman" (PDF). Historic Scotland.
- "Morris and Steedman: Clarity of intent: Early Homes 1952-70" (PDF). Prospect.
