= Scottish Poetry Library =

Library in Edinburgh, Scotland

Coordinates: 55.9514°N 3.1781°W

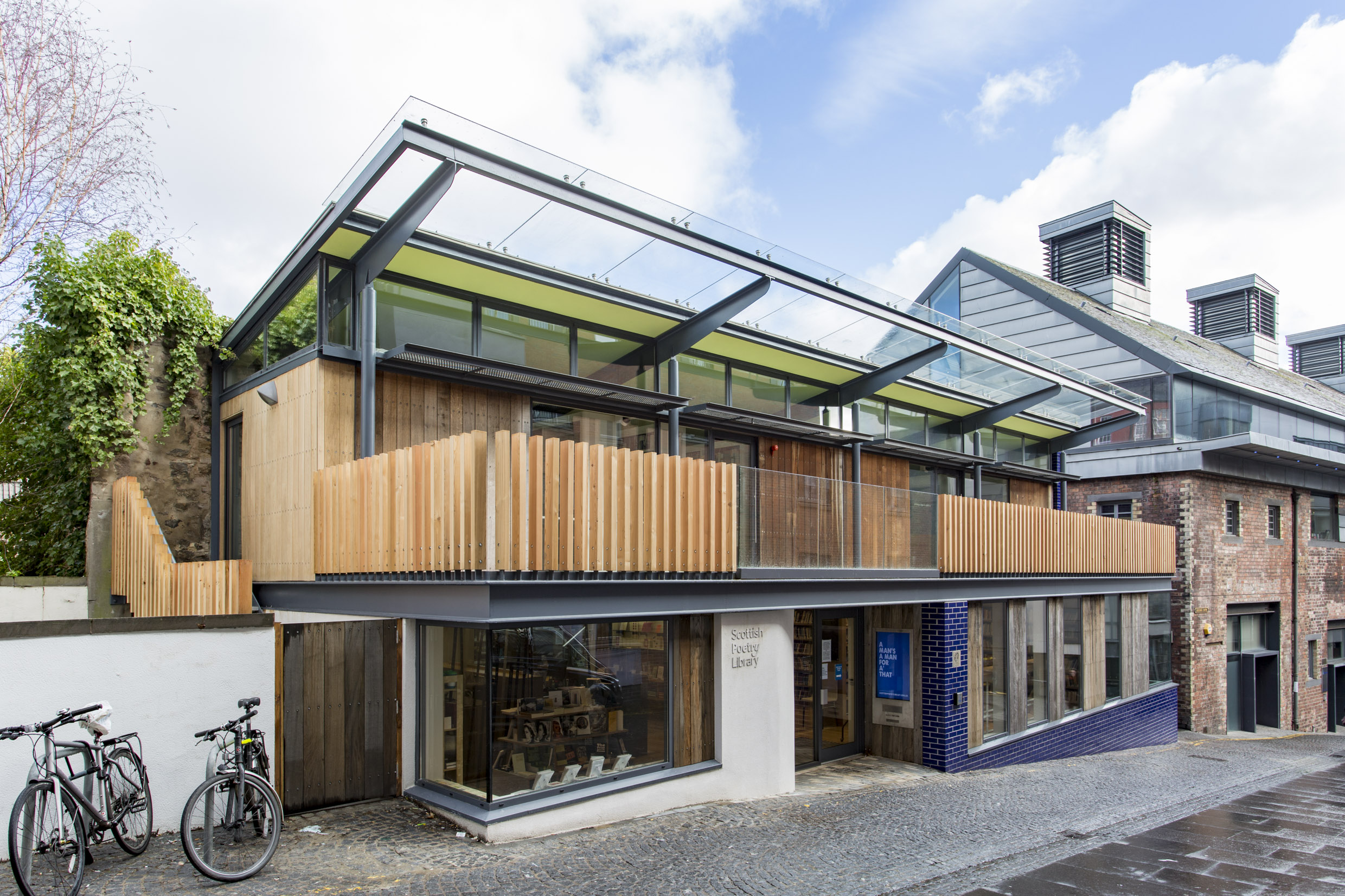
Scottish Poetry Library, Crichton's Close, Edinburgh, 2017

The Scottish Poetry Library is a public library with charitable status specialising in contemporary Scottish writing in English, Scots and Scottish Gaelic. The library, which is free to join for UK residents, celebrated its 40th anniversary in 2024. The SPL houses a borrowing and reference collection of books, pamphlets and audio material. Visitors are able to browse the shelves and read in the library.

== History and status ==
The library was founded in 1984 by poet Tessa Ransford. Tom Hubbard was its first librarian. The present Director, Asif Khan, was appointed from June 2016. Khan is supported by a team of librarians and specialist staff with expertise in collections management, special projects, learning, events and communications.

The SPL is a limited company with charitable status. From November 2023, its Board was co-Chaired by Claudia Daventry and Charlie Roy. The SPL has status as a Creative Scotland Regularly Funded Organisation (RFO) with a remit to support audience development, literacy through reader development and creative writing classes with diverse groups, schools and public libraries, and to promote opportunities for writers and performers for showcasing their talents at home and abroad.

== The building ==
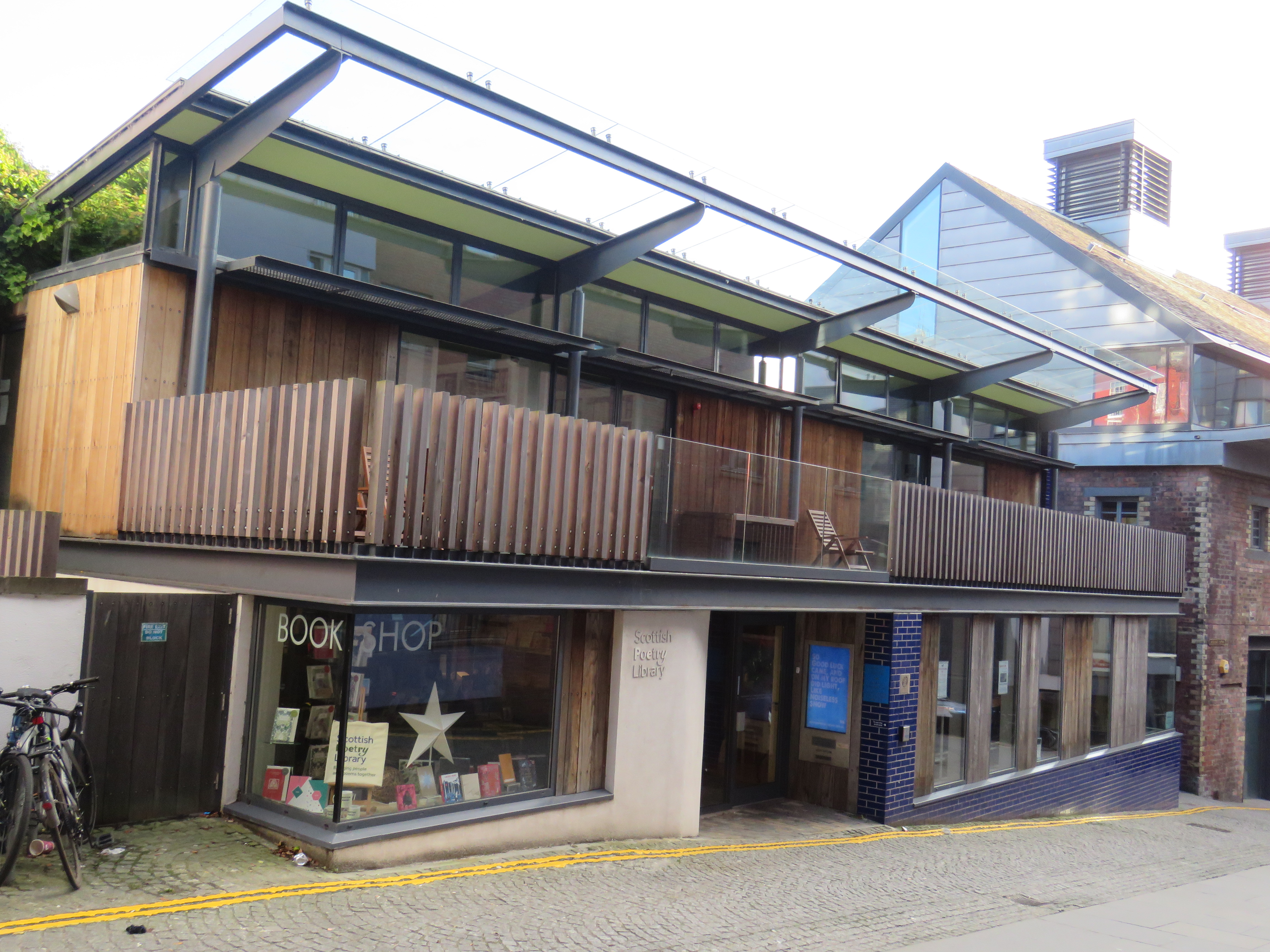
The exterior of the library on Crichton's Close in Edinburgh.

Since 1999, the library has been based at 5 Crichton's Close, just off the Canongate in Edinburgh's Old Town. The library building was designed by Malcolm Fraser Architects, and was shortlisted for Channel 4's "Building of the Year" in 2000. It has been described as "a poem in glass and stone", and was included in Prospect magazine's 2005 list of the 100 best modern Scottish buildings.
