= Eden Court Theatre =

Theatre in Inverness, Scotland

Coordinates: 57°28′22″N 4°13′49″W

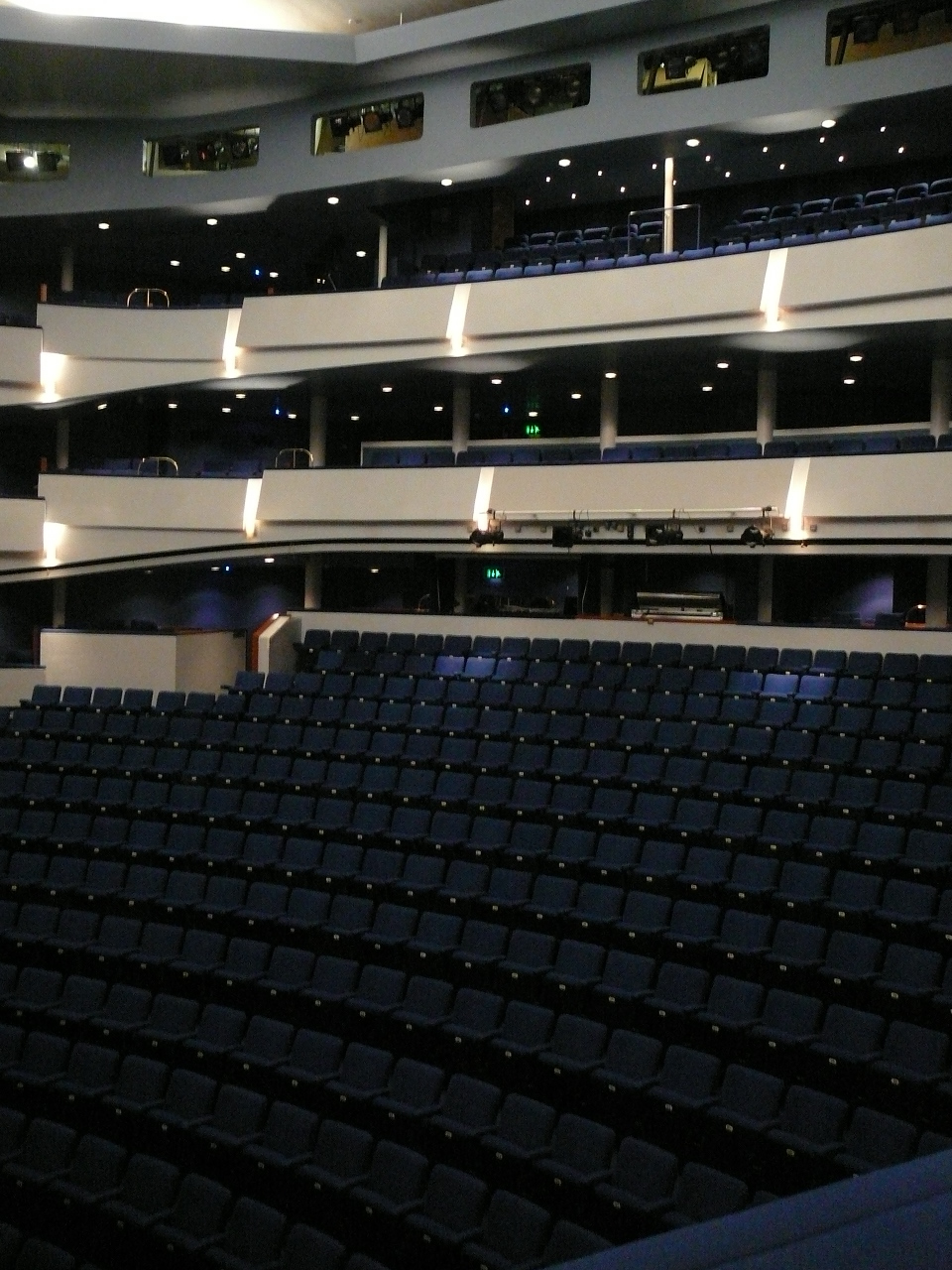
- Interactive map of Eden Court Theatre
- Address: Bishops Road; Inverness; Scotland
- Type: Regional theatre and Cinema
- Current use: Touring and local productions

Construction
- Opened: 1976
- Rebuilt: 2007 by Page / Park
- Architect: Law Dunbar Naismith

Website
- www.eden-court.co.uk

Eden Court Theatre (Scottish Gaelic: Cùirt an Easbaig, "Bishop's Court") is a large theatre, cinema and arts venue situated in Inverness, Scotland close to the banks of the River Ness. The theatre has recently undergone a complete refurbishment and major extension, adding a second theatre, two dedicated cinema screens, two performance/dance studios, improved dressing room and green room facilities and additional office space. The theatre's restaurant and bar facilities have also been totally overhauled and improved.

== History ==
Plans for a theatre, restaurant and dance hall were first put forward in November 1967, and lengthy negotiations followed. The Eden Court Theatre was formally opened on 15 April 1976 by Andrew Cruickshank MBE, an actor best known for his portrayal of Dr Cameron in BBC's long-running series "Dr Finlay's Casebook". It was built on a site next to the Ness river, and incorporated the Gothic Bishop's Palace residence (from which it took its name) into a new building designed by architects Law Dunbar and Naismith. The theatre was at that time a revolution to Inverness, and the wider Highland Region. It provided modern theatre performance space for the first time since the early 1930s. Inverness had previously had a number of theatres, including the Theatre Royal, previously situated on Bank Street, which burned down in 1934 and the Empire Theatre on Academy Street. This theatre had originally opened as The Central Hall Picture House in 1912, but after the Theatre Royal burned down, it was converted to a fully functioning theatre and reopened as the Empire around 1934. The building was designed by A. Ross & Son and was eventually demolished in 1971. Many famous names performed at this popular venue: Harry Lauder, Renee Houston and Calum Kennedy and The Corries, to name a few. Today the modern Penta Hotel building stands in its place. A theatre originally built as an Opera House, with full stage facilities, by the name of The Playhouse, also existed in Inverness situated on Academy Street, in the town centre. It was built by Alexander B King, the cinema magnate, and it was one of the flagship cinemas of Caledonian Associated Cinemas Ltd (CAC) who operated out of Inverness. The Playhouse staged occasional shows, but was principally a cinema seating 1,429, and had a proscenium opening of 45 feet (14 metres), but the only opera ever presented there was by the local Amateur Operatic Society after the Empire Theatre was demolished. The building also hosted the Gaelic Mòd, with performances televised live by BBC Scotland. Andy Stewart used to put on his show there, as well as at other CAC venues all over Scotland, including the Lyceum at Dumfries and the Playhouse in Perth. The Playhouse in Inverness was set on fire by an arsonist in 1972 and was later demolished to make way for the new Eastgate Shopping Development.

== Present day ==
Eden Court reopened in November 2007, having undergone a complete refurbishment and extension by Robertson Construction and Page\Park Architects. Upon its reopening it became the largest combined arts centre in Scotland. With the reconstruction complete the theatre now has two auditoriums. The main auditorium, renamed the Empire Theatre, has a capacity of just under 840. The second auditorium, named the OneTouch Theatre, has a capacity of about 270. The two new cinemas, La Scala and The Playhouse, have capacities of 125 and 78 respectively.

The Empire Theatre, La Scala and Playhouse are named after the former venues of those names (the first La Scala was a cinema in Strother's Lane which closed down in the 1990s). The OneTouch Theatre is named after the OneTouch Ultra diabetes monitor, produced by local employer LifeScan. La Scala and Playhouse host the annual Inverness Film Festival which includes many Scottish premieres, as well as independent and foreign language films.

The refurbished theatre also includes the Jim Love Studio, named after the late Inverness Courier editor.

== Awards ==
The theatre has won an award from the Royal Institution of Chartered Surveyors (RICS). It won the Community Benefit prize at the 2008 awards.

It won the 2009 "Specialist Carpentry Refurbishment Award" for the high standard of carpentry work carried out in the Bishop's Palace as undertaken by specialist contractor Ryvoan Developments.

In 2024, Eden Court Highlands won the Venue of the Year award at the MG ALBA Scots Trad Music Awards.

== See also ==
- List of Category A listed buildings in Highland
- List of post-war Category A listed buildings in Scotland
