= Forth Valley College =

Further education college in Scotland

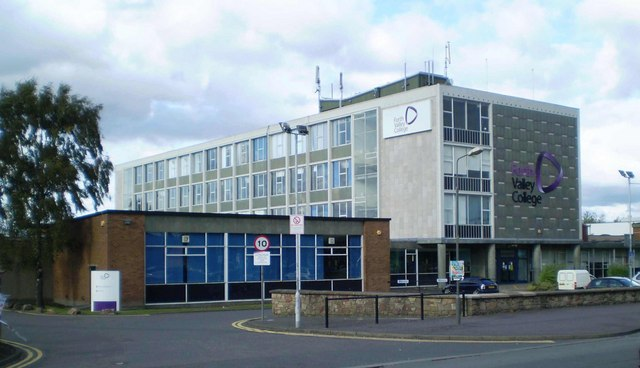
- Motto: Making Learning Work
- Established: 2005
- Principal: Kenny MacInnes
- Academic staff: 500+
- Students: 13,500
- Location: Falkirk (College HQ); Alloa; Stirling, Scotland
- Website: www.forthvalley.ac.uk

Forth Valley College of Further and Higher Education (Forth Valley College or FVC) is a college of further education and higher education located in Scotland. The college was created in 2005 as the first regional college in Scotland from the merger of Falkirk College and Clackmannan College. It currently operates from three main campuses in Falkirk, Alloa and Stirling. The college previously operated within a community campus in the Raploch area of Stirling.

Forth Valley College annually enrolls over 13,500 students and offers courses from access to degree level.

== Campuses ==
=== Raploch Community Campus (2007–2022) ===
The Raploch Community Campus opened in October 2007. In May 2022, the college announced plans to pull out from the Raploch Community Campus as part of budget cuts made in the wake of the COVID-19 pandemic, Brexit, and allocation of outside funding.

=== Alloa Campus (2011–present) ===
The Alloa Campus officially opened in September 2011. The campus has a hair and beauty training salon which is run by students and is open to the public. It also hosts Scotland's International Environment Centre and a new Health and Social Care Skills Simulation Suite.

In 2025 the Alloa Campus faced closure due to financial pressures on Forth Valley College. In February 2026, following a 10 per cent funding increase for colleges in the Scottish budget, college management announced that the Alloa Campus would remain open for at least another year.

=== Stirling Campus (2012–present) ===
The Stirling Campus officially opened in September 2012. The campus has its own training restaurant called The Gallery which is run by students and is open to the public for its lunch and dinner menus. It has been top rated on Trip Advisor and recently won Best Dining Experience at the Scottish Hospitality Awards 2026.

=== New Falkirk Campus (2020–present) ===
The new Falkirk campus and college headquarters officially opened in January 2020. It was designed by Reiach and Hall Architects. It is the largest of all the campuses, possessing a number of different buildings. These include the main building which stands two storeys tall and includes a canteen, gym, the library and classrooms. There are also two single-storey wooden buildings. The campus is also home to a practice plant which allows chemical engineering students to gain practice in certain types of operations. The college is located close to the ground of Falkirk F.C., central retail park and the border of Falkirk and Grangemouth.

The Falkirk campus, similar to the Alloa campus, also houses a hair and beauty training salon which is run by students and is open to the public.

In July 2022, Falkirk campus was shortlisted for the Stirling Prize for excellence in architecture, and the RIAS Andrew Doolan Best Building in Scotland Award.

== Academics ==
Forth Valley College offers education and training courses from access to degree level within multiple modes of attendance including full-time, part-time, evening, flexible study, and online. The college also provides vocational training and professional qualifications.

Forth Valley offers courses within nine teaching departments including:

- Access and Progression
- Applied Science, Maths and Mechanical Engineering
- Business
- Business Development
- Care, Health and Sport
- Construction
- Creative Industries
- Electrical, Instrumentation and Chemical Engineering
- Hospitality and Salon Services
