= Carbuncle Awards =

Architecture awards

The Carbuncle Awards were architecture prizes, presented by the Scottish magazine Urban Realm (formerly Prospect) to buildings and areas in Scotland intermittently from 2000 until 2015.

They were established following a discussion about why policy initiatives to improve the quality of the built environment seemed to be having so little impact beyond the centres of Scotland's key cities.

The name of the awards was derived from a comment by Charles, Prince of Wales (now Charles III), an outspoken critic of modern architecture, who in 1984 described Ahrends Burton Koralek's proposed extension of London's National Gallery as a "monstrous carbuncle on the face of a much-loved and elegant friend".

There were three award categories:

- Plook on the Plinth Award "for the most dismal town in Scotland". A "plook" is a Scottish noun for pimple. (Officially Retired)
- The Pock Mark Award "for the worst planning decision".
- The Zit Building Award "for the worst building completed since the last awards".

Public nominations were made via the magazine's website, with a small group of critics selecting the final winners.

Cumbernauld in North Lanarkshire won the Plook on the Plinth Award twice and was the town most frequently nominated for the award.

The Carbuncle Awards inspired the Carbuncle Cup, another architecture prize launched in 2006 which was given annually by Building Design magazine to "the ugliest building in the United Kingdom completed in the last 12 months". The latter went on to achieve somewhat greater prominence in the media, and was last held in 2018. In 2024, Soho based magazine The Fence revived the Carbuncle Cup award.

== Winners ==
Plook on the Plinth Award

| Year | Winner | Also shortlisted |
|---|---|---|
| 2000 | Airdrie | Cumbernauld, Campbeltown, Ardrossan and Balloch |
| 2001 | Cumbernauld | Gretna, Aviemore, Dumbarton and two areas of Edinburgh |
| 2005 | Cumbernauld | Cowdenbeath, Dalkeith, Ardrossan, Greenock and Granton (north Edinburgh) |
| 2007 | Coatbridge | — |
| 2009 | Glenrothes | New Cumnock and Motherwell |
| 2010 | John o' Groats / Denny | East Kilbride, Inverness and Lochgelly |
| 2011 | Linwood | Nairn and Fort William |
| 2013 | New Cumnock | Broxburn, Fort William, Kirkintilloch, Motherwell, Newmilns and Paisley |
| 2015 | Aberdeen | Cumbernauld, East Kilbride and Leven |
| 2025 | Port Glasgow | Ayr, Hamilton, Arbroath |

Notes:

- The shortlist section includes the towns that were in consideration for the award by Urban Realm
- The 2010 award was passed to runners-up Denny, after original winners John o' Groats refused it
- The 2005 judging panel included the artist Richard Demarco and the Sunday Herald's associate editor Alan Taylor
- The 2011 judging panel included architecture critic Mark Chalmers and Urban Realm editor John Glenday
- After the 2025 award was awarded to Port Glasgow, the backlash caused the award to be Officially retired.

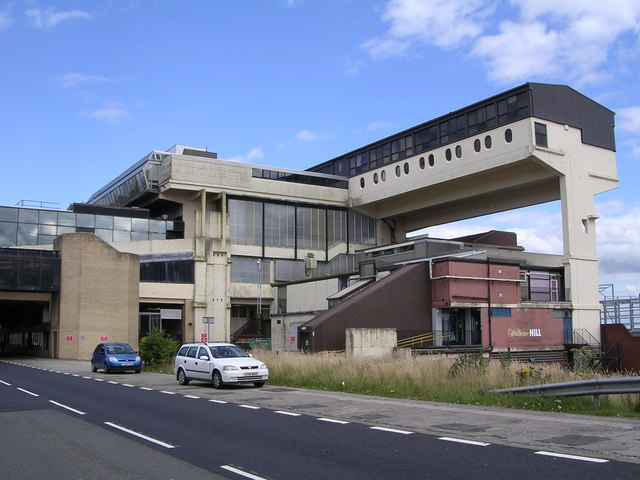
Cumbernauld, winner of the Carbuncle Award in 2001 and 2005

The Zit Building Award

| Year | Winner | Shortlist |
|---|---|---|
| 2000 | UGC, now Cineworld in Glasgow | — |
| 2001 | Maternity hospital at Glasgow Royal Infirmary | Edinburgh Business Plaza The Exchange, Haymarket railway station |
| 2005 | The Pinnacle Building, Glasgow | — |
| 2011 | Menie Clubhouse | Fraserburgh Pool and Invergordon Fabrication shed |
| 2015 | Edinburgh Airport eastern terminal expansion | — |

== See also ==
- Carbuncle Cup
- Cumbernauld
- Urban Realm
