= Malcolm Fraser (architect) =

Scottish architect (born 1959)

Malcolm Fraser (born 21 July 1959) is an architect from Edinburgh, Scotland. He was the founder of Malcolm Fraser Architects, a firm of architects based in the Old Town of Edinburgh from 1993. The company entered liquidation on 21 August 2015 and Fraser worked with Halliday Fraser Munro Architects before setting up anew with Robin Livingstone as Fraser/Livingstone Architects in January 2019.

== Biography ==
Alexander Malcolm Fraser was born on 21 July 1959 to Margaret (née Watters) and William Fraser (Structural engineer, with Blyth and Blyth, for many of Edinburgh's best post-war buildings). He attended George Watson's College, going on to study architecture at the University of Edinburgh, graduating with an MA Hons, DipArch in 1985. Following University he worked as a community architect in Wester Hailes in Edinburgh; with architect and theorist Christopher Alexander in Berkeley, California; conservation practices in Edinburgh; and with poet and artist Ian Hamilton Finlay at his garden, Little Sparta, near Edinburgh.

He founded his architectural practice, Malcolm Fraser Architects, in 1993. It first made its name developing bars and restaurants for clients such as Pizza Express, and with lottery-funded arts projects. The practice's work encompassed conservation and new build, often in historic contexts such as Edinburgh's World Heritage Site, based on respect for the historic built context and the need to build within it in a rooted, confident, contemporary way. Its Edinburgh Climate Change Institute, for the University of Edinburgh, became the first listed building to achieve BREEAM "Outstanding" award. The practice won eight RIBA awards and also completed masterplanning and construction work for volume housebuilders that won for them, for the first time in Scotland, major awards - for The Drum, Bo'ness, West Lothian and Princess Gate, Fairmilehead, Edinburgh. The practice ceased trading in 2015, after 22 years of work, but Fraser/Livingstone Architects continue its work of cultural regeneration, community empowerment and an enlarged view of sustainability that encompasses heritage, retrofit and regeneration – social closening, in all its forms.

Fraser married architect Helen Lucas in 1988 and has one son and two daughters.

== Advocacy ==
=== Edinburgh ===
The practice, between 1999 and 2009, won the Edinburgh Architectural Association (EAA) Building of the Year/Silver Medal six times, the Conservation award twice plus other EAA Awards and Commendations. Using this as a platform Fraser has campaigned about built environment issues in Edinburgh, including initiatives for Princes Street, the Grassmarket and the redevelopment of Boroughmuir High School.

=== Public life ===
In 2002, Fraser was appointed as the inaugural Deputy-Chair of Architecture and Design Scotland – a non-departmental public body (or quango) which acts as the Scottish Government's advisor on the built environment. He resigned in 2004 over the organisation's unwillingness to examine whether the UK Government's use of Public-Private Partnerships for public buildings such as schools represented value-for-money.

Fraser was appointed visiting professor at the University of the West of England in 2003 and Geddes Honorary Professorial Fellow at the Edinburgh School of Architecture and Landscape Architecture, part of the University of Edinburgh, in 2009. He has also lectured in Europe, China and North America. Fraser sits on the board of the Common Weal, a Scottish think tank, campaigning and advocacy organisation. During the run-up to the 2014 Scottish Independence Referendum Fraser acted as spokesman for the group 'Architects for Yes'.

=== VAT ===
During his time as a columnist for the weekly architectural journal Building Design, in 2003, Fraser initiated a Flat VAT campaign to standardise Value Added Tax across new build (currently 0%) and repair (then 17.5%) that was taken up by Richard Rodgers and Debra Shipley MP but rejected by the then Chancellor of the Exchequer, Gordon Brown MP.

=== Banks ===
Fraser acted as spokesman for the Merger Action Group of Scottish businessmen who took Her Majesty's Government to the Competition Appeal Tribunal over the Government's alleged "ripping-up" of legislation and failure to heed anti-competition warnings when it enabled the acquisition of HBOS by Lloyds TSB in 2008.

=== Town Centre Review ===
Fraser led and authored the Scottish Government's Town Centre Review "Community and Enterprise in Scotland's Town Centres", which looked to structural change to bring investment and footfall in towns. The Government's response included adopting the review's recommendation for a "Town Centre First" principle across all its activities.

== Main completed work and awards ==
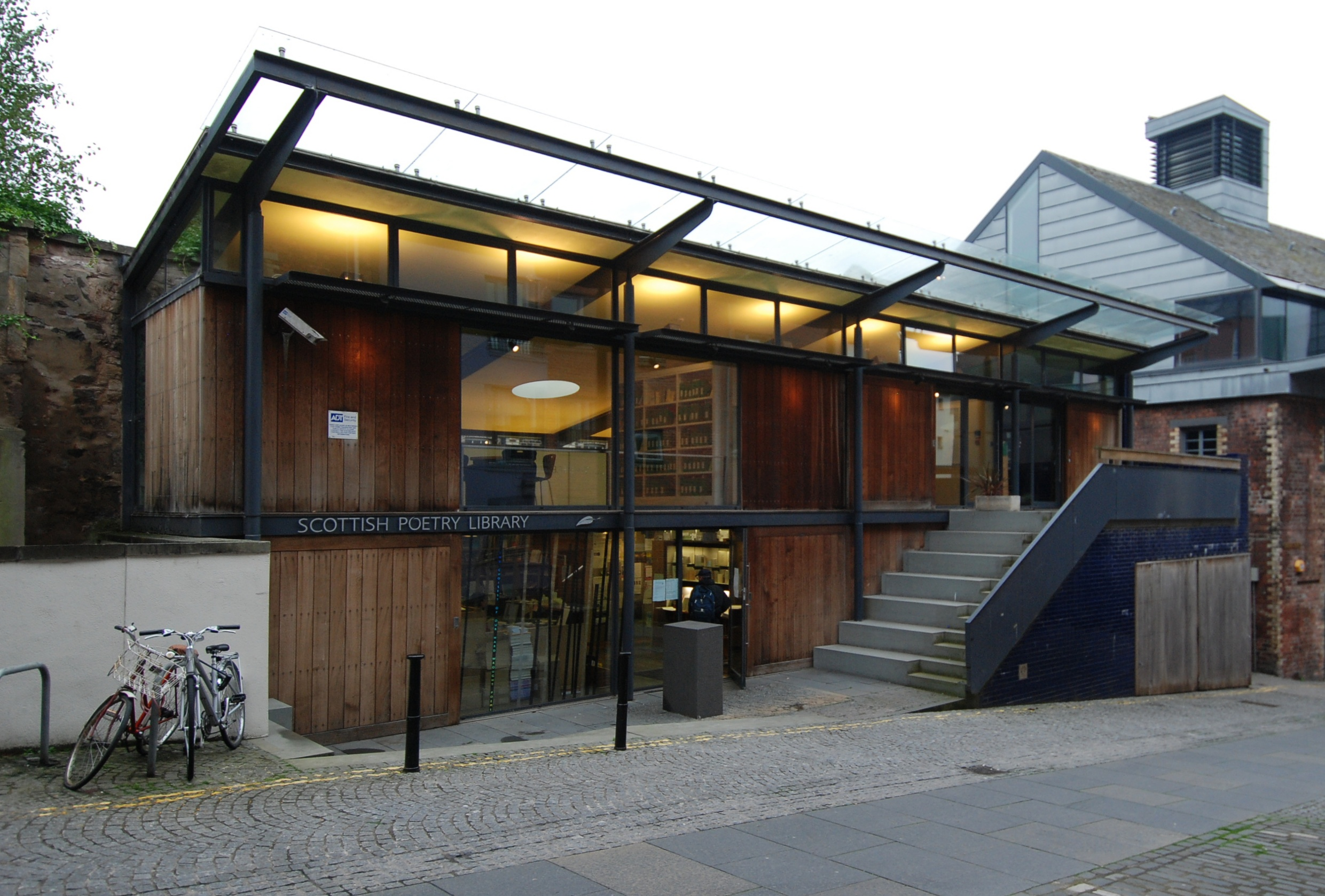
Scottish Poetry Library, Edinburgh, 1999

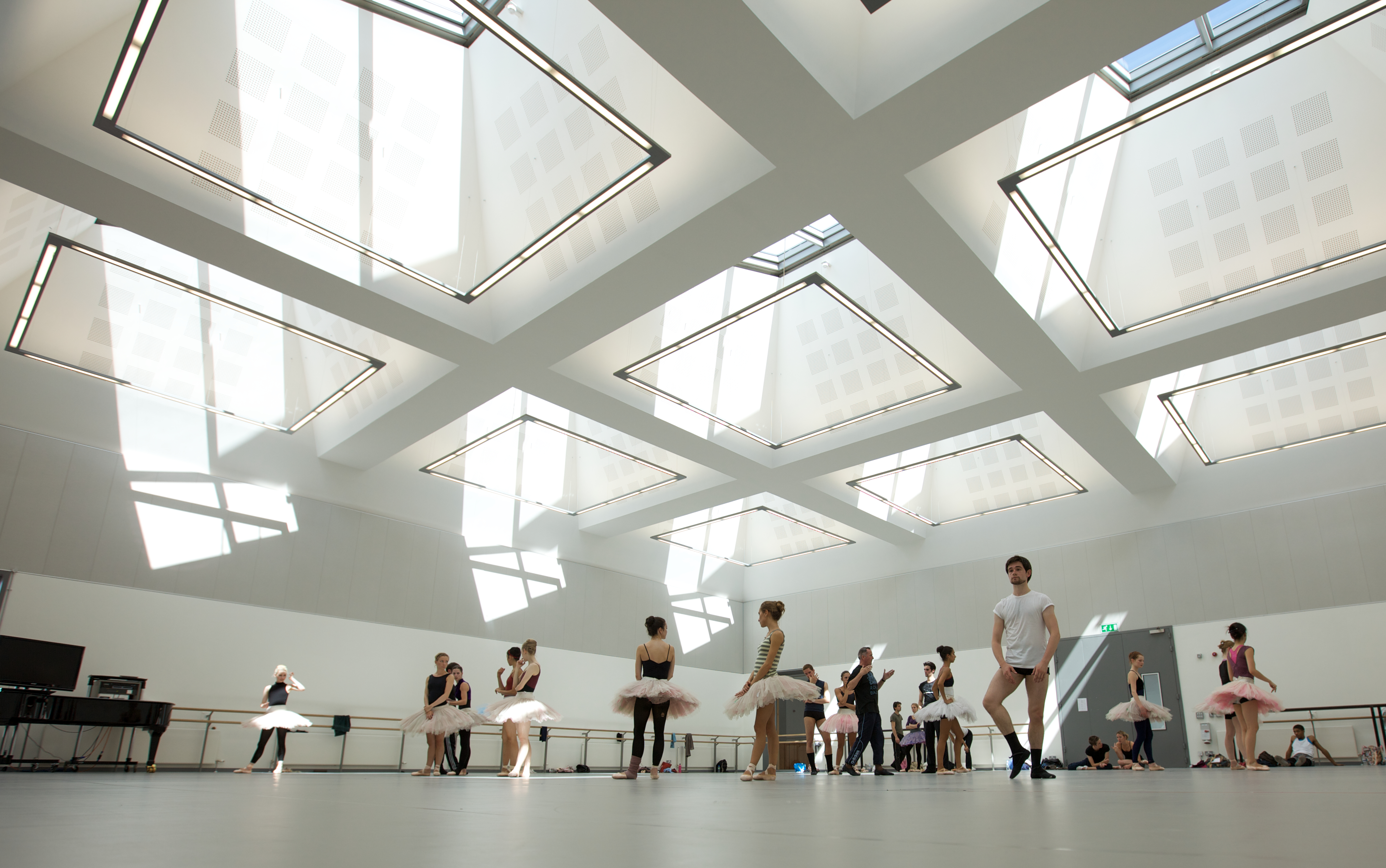
Scottish Ballet headquarters at The Tramway, Glasgow, 2009 - Photo by Andy Ross

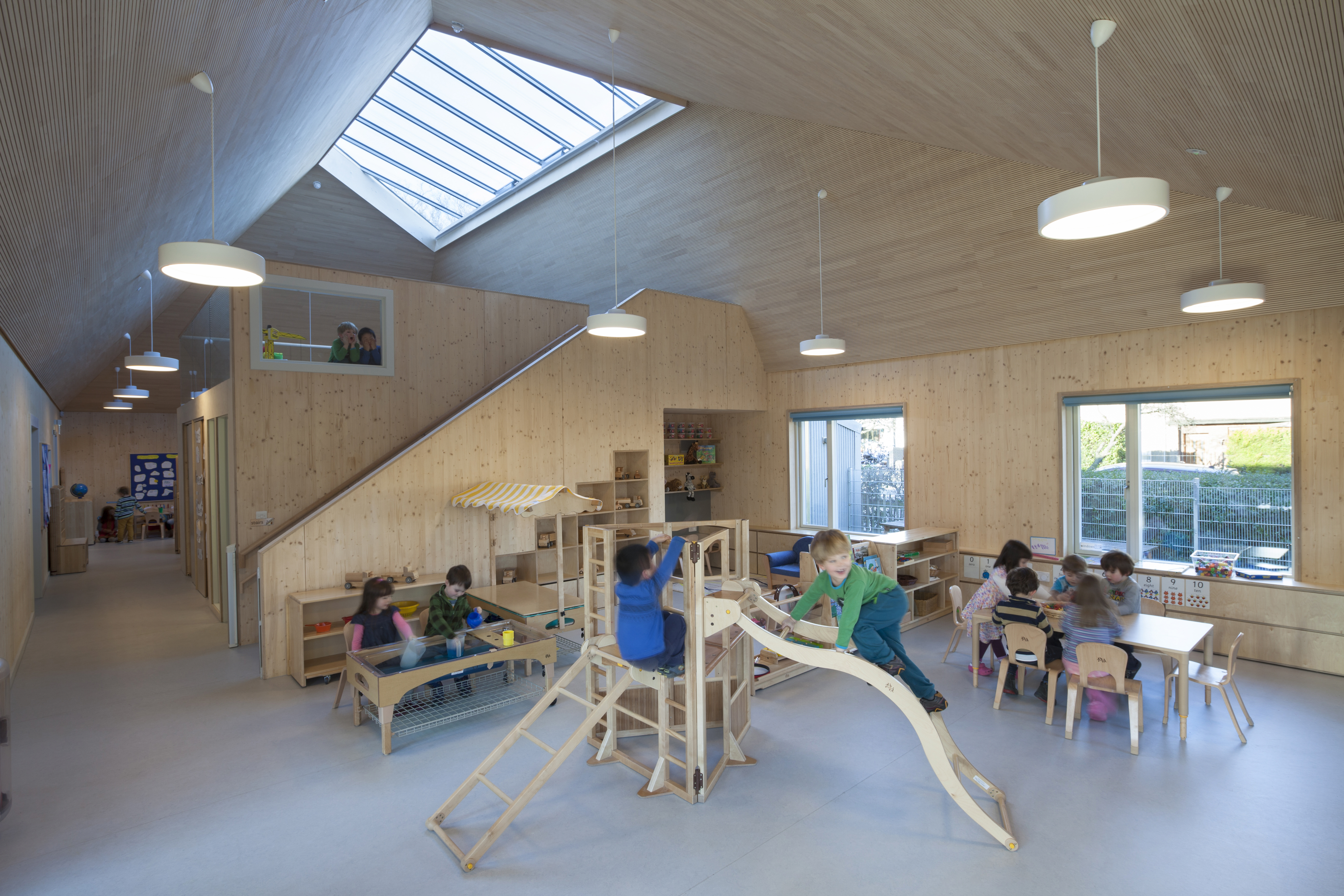
Arcadia Nursery, King's Buildings, University of Edinburgh 2014 - Photo by Angus Bremner

Malcolm Fraser Architects' projects in chronological order with year of completion, major awards and citations:

- Scottish Poetry Library, Edinburgh: 1999
  - Royal Scottish Academy Gold Medal for Architecture: 1997
  - Winner, RIBA Award: 2000
  - Prospect 100 best modern Scottish buildings: no.9
- DanceBase, Edinburgh: 2001
  - Winner, RIAS Andrew Doolan Award for Architecture: 2002
  - Winner, RIBA Award: 2002
  - Finalist, Stirling Prize: 2002
- The Drum, Bo’ness: 2003
  - Saltire Society Housing Award: 2005
- Dance City, Newcastle upon Tyne: 2005
  - Winner, RIBA Award: 2007
- Scottish Storytelling Centre, Edinburgh: 2006
  - Winner, RIBA Award: 2007
- HBOS Headquarters, The Mound, Edinburgh: 2006
- Princess Gate housing, Edinburgh: 2007
- Berwick Workspace, Berwick-upon-Tweed: 2007
  - Winner, RIBA Award: 2009
- Dovecot Studios, Edinburgh: 2009
  - Winner, RIBA Award: 2010
- Scottish Ballet headquarters at The Tramway, Glasgow: 2009
  - Winner, Scottish Design Awards: Architecture Grand Prix and Best Public Building: 2010
- Royal Conservatoire of Scotland, Speir's Lock Studio, Glasgow: 2011 and 2015
  - Winner, RIBA Award.
- Linlithgow Burgh Halls: 2012
- Edinburgh Climate Change Institute, Edinburgh: 2014
  - Winner, Edinburgh Architectural Association Best Building of the Year; RICS Building Conservation Award; Scottish Design Award for Education Building: 2014
  - BREEAM "Outstanding".
- University of Edinburgh Arcadia Nursery, King's Buildings, Edinburgh: 2014
  - Winner, Scottish Design Awards: Best education building; Edinburgh Architectural Association Awards Wood Award; Edinburgh Architectural Association's Building of the Year Award(Commendation): 2015 Also, RIAS Award; RIBA Award; Wood for Good/ Forestry Commission Scotland Award; Zero Waste Scotland's Efficiency Award: 2015
- West Pilton Crescent Council Housing, Edinburgh: 2015
  - Winner, Saltire Award: 2015
- Stromness Warehouse, Library and Council Hub, Orkney: 2015
  - Scottish Awards for Quality in Planning - Overall Winner 2017
  - RTPI Silver Jubilee Cup - Overall UK Winner
- Lews Castle and Museum nan Eilan, Stornoway, Lewis: 2015
- Leith Fort Colonies (delivered by Collective Architecture)
  - RIAS Award: 2018
  - Saltire Award & Medal: 2018
  - EAA Building of the Year - Highly Commended: 2018
  - Homes for Scotland - Affordable Housing of the Year: 2018
  - Scottish Design Awards - Affordable Housing of the Year: 2018
- Collective Gallery on Calton Hill (delivered by Collective Architecture)
  - RIAS Award: 2019
  - RIBA Award: 2019
  - EAA Conservation Award – Commended: 2019
  - RAIS Doolan Award – shortlist: 2019
  - Civic Trust Awards – Highly Commended: 2021
- Bridgend Community Farmhouse, (delivered by Halliday Fraser Munro)
  - MacEwan Award for social architecture – Commended: 2019
  - Scottish Design Awards – Regeneration Award: 2019
  - Scottish Civic Trust - My Place Commendation: 2019

Fraser/Livingstone Architects’ projects in chronological order with year of completion, major awards and citations:

- The Toll House
  - EAA Small Project Winner 2022
- Simon Square
  - EAA Residential and Building of the Year 2022
  - Scottish Homes Awards – Innovation in Design 2022
  - Scottish Design Awards – Gold Award
  - Saltire Housing Awards – Award and overall Saltire Medal
