= European Architecture Students Assembly =

Platform for cultural and educational exchange connecting architecture students

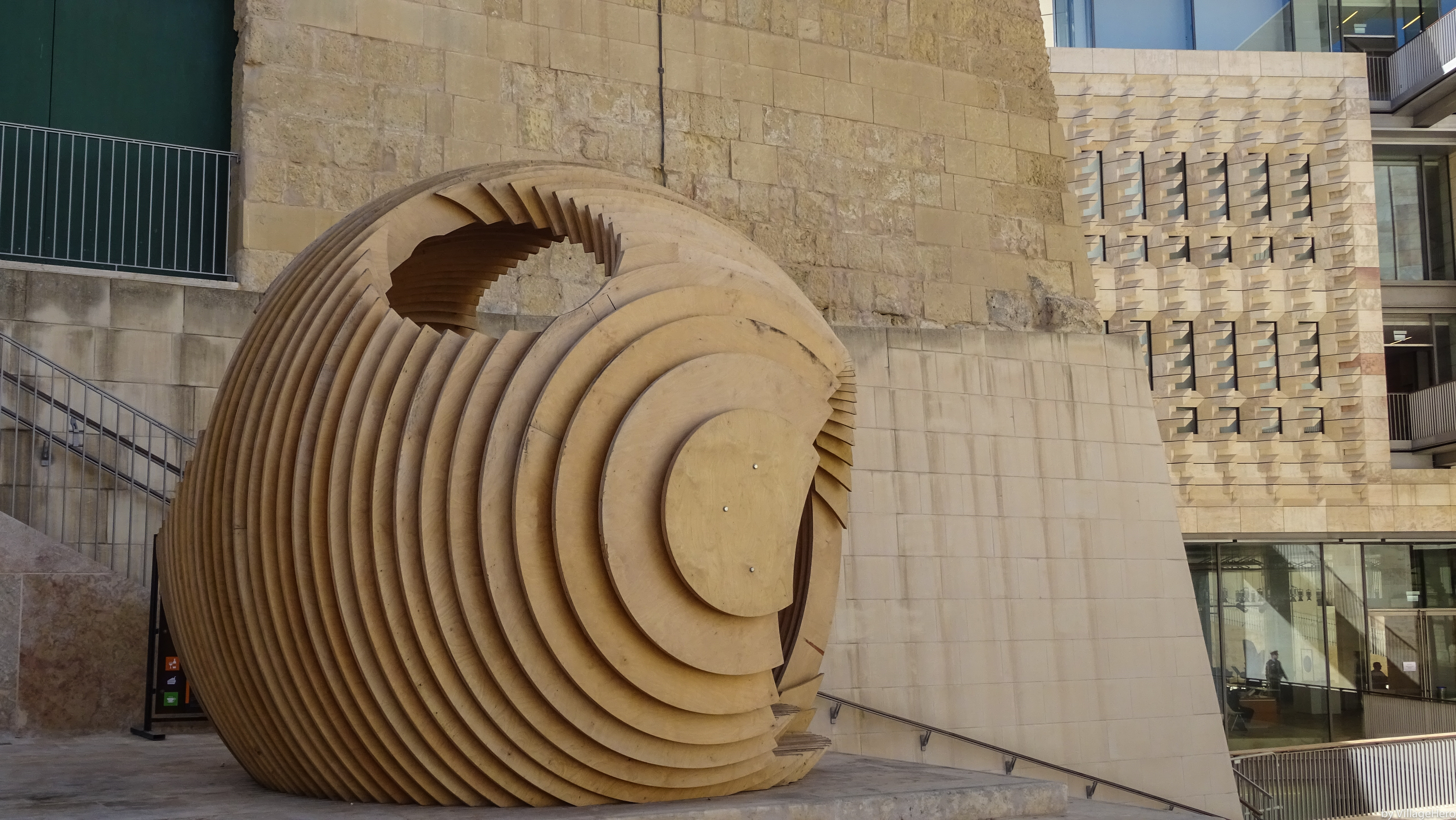
Il-Boċċa, a spherical seating area in Valletta, Malta designed by architecture students in an EASA workshop in 2015. It has been removed.

European Architecture Student Assembly (EASA) was founded in 1981 by architect students like Geoff Haslam and Richard Murphy and is closely related to the Winterschool concept, which organises similar events for UK students of architecture. EASA takes place each summer in a different country, with the event usually lasting two weeks. It is organised by students of architecture for students of architecture and the concept is operated on a cooperative basis. In fall at INCM, Intermediate National Contact Meeting, the location for EASA is decided one and a half years in advance. Typically, 400 students take part in the event and engage in workshops, exhibitions, lectures and social events loosely based around a specific theme. These events are run by a combination of academics and students and encompass a wide variety of activities with a greater or lesser relationship to architecture. The event is funded through a combination of attendance fees (which vary for each country based upon ability to pay), grants and sponsorship, all arranged by the organising committee for each event.

EASA has little or no formal structure, in that each event is organised as a unique occurrence - though a system of National Contacts (NCs) ensures that the event each year is well-supported. NCs also typically meet once a year to discuss the previous EASA and prepare for the next. Students come from over 40 European countries to the event each year. Recent Assemblies have seen students participating from the US, India and Central American countries.

== EASA Summer Meetings ==
- 1981 Liverpool, England: Starting up the EASA Experience
- 1982 Delft, Netherlands: Architecture of an Uncertain Future
- 1983 Lisbon, Portugal: Social Spaces
- 1984 Aarhus, Denmark: Turning point in Architecture
- 1985 Athens, Greece: Interpretation and Action in the City
- 1986 Turin, Italy: Architetture Latenti
- 1987 Helsinki-Putikko, Finland: Architecture and Nature
- 1988 Berlin, Germany: The Dimension Between
- 1989 Marseille, France: Heritage et Creativé
- 1990 Karlskrona, Sweden: Exploration
- 1991 Verkhoturie and Kolomna, USSR: Regeneration (This assembly was held at two sites)
- 1992 Ürgüp, Turkey: Vision 2000 Environment
- 1993 Sandwick, Scotland: The Isle
- 1994 Liège, Belgium: Consommer l'Inconsumable
- 1995 Zamość, Poland: Beyond the Borders
- 1996 Clermont-l'Hérault, France: Dream Builders!
- 1997 The Train, Scandinavia: Advancing Architecture (This assembly was held on board a train driving through Denmark, Sweden, and Norway)
- 1998 Valletta, Malta: Living on the Edge
- 1999 Kavala, Greece: Osmosis
- 2000 Antwerp and Rotterdam, Belgium/Netherlands: Dis-Similarities
- 2001 Imbros, Turkey: No Theme
- 2002 Vis, Croatia: Senses
- 2003 Syddjurs-Friland, Denmark: Sustainable Living
- 2004 Roubaix, France: Metropolitan - Micropolitain,
- 2005 Bergün, Switzerland: Trans, Transit, Transition.
- 2006 Budapest, Hungary: Common Places
- 2007 Eleusina, Greece: City Index
- 2008 Dublin-Letterfrack, Ireland: Adaptation
- 2009 Brescia, Italy: supermARCHet
- 2010 Manchester, UK: Identity
- 2011 Cádiz, Spain: deCOASTruction
- 2012 Helsinki, Finland: Wastelands
- 2013 Žužemberk, Slovenia: Reaction
- 2014 Veliko Tărnovo, Bulgaria: Symбиоза
- 2015 Valletta, Malta: Links
- 2016 Nida, Lithuania: Not Yet Decided
- 2017 Fredericia, Denmark: Hospitality. Finding the framework
- 2018 Rijeka, Croatia: RE:Easa
- 2019 Villars-sur-Ollon, Switzerland: EASA:Tourist
- 2020 Valga, Estonia: Apathy
- 2021 Kragujevac, Serbia: Reality
- 2022 Călărași, Romania: 1:1
- 2023 Sheffield, United Kingdom: Commons
- 2024 Benidorm, Spain: Shanzhai
- 2025 Savonlinna, Finland: Rhizome
- 2026 Waterford, Ireland: Seanchaí

=== INCM (Intermediate National Contact Meeting) ===
The INCM is held every year in autumn. They are the main event next to the assembly to keep the continuity of easa. There have been such memorable meetings like Berlin 1990, where the "Lichterfelder statement" was made. The "Lichterfelder Statement" later became the "easa-guide" developed, which is updated yearly at the NC-meetings.

- 1985 Barcelona, Spain
- 1986 Vienna, Austria
- 1987 Budapest, Hungary
- 1988 Oslo, Norway
- 1989 Kraków, Poland
- 1990 Plovdiv, Bulgaria
- 1991 Berlin, Germany (Lichterfelder statement)
- 1992 Turin, Italy
- 1993 Ljubljana, Slovenia
- 1994 Tallinn, Estonia
- 1995 Zurich, Switzerland
- 1996 Istanbul, Turkey
- 1997 Sinaia, Romania
- 1998 Sandomierz, Poland
- 1999 Mannheim, Germany
- 2000 Tal-Fanal, Gozo, Malta
- 2001 Berlin, Germany
- 2002 Bornholm, Denmark
- 2003 Ljubljana, Slovenia
- 2004 Belgrade, Serbia
- 2005 Brighton, United Kingdom
- 2006 Moscow, Russia
- 2007 Motovun, Croatia
- 2008 Nicosia, Cyprus
- 2009 Schaan, Liechtenstein
- 2010 Copenhagen, Denmark
- 2011 Baku, Azerbaijan
- 2012 Vienna, Austria
- 2013 Bucharest, Romania
- 2014 Berlin, Germany
- 2015 Glasgow-Forres, Scotland
- 2016 Madrid, Spain
- 2017 Lapland, Finland
- 2018 Vitosha, Bulgaria
- 2019 Trpejca, Macedonia
- 2020 Latvia (online)
- 2021 Leuven, Belgium
- 2022 Palanga, Lithuania
- 2023 Borca di Cadore, Italy
- 2025 Riga, Latvia: Resonate

=== SESAM (Small European Architecture Students Assembly Meeting) ===
The SESAM is an event arranged by the EASA network. Like the basic idea of the EASA, a SESAM can give an addition and/or alternative to the education of the students. The independence and off-university-character creates an informal atmosphere. The SESAM is a workshop with a small number of participants. Through this concentrated character the SESAM allows to work on a tight theme. After a number of similar events in the year before in Italy, the Netherlands, Czechoslovakia, etc., the first EASA workshop with the name SESAM was realized 1992 in Vilafamés (Valencia, Spain, October 1992, 50 participants). SESAM2007 was held in Aarhus, Denmark on 23–25 November 2007. The next scheduled SESAM meeting is due to take place in 2021 in Slavutych, Ukraine.

- 2025 Nicosia, Cyprus: Identity
- 2026 Triesen, Liechtenstein: Ground

=== Pivo SESAM ===
The event is an excuse to meet with the other members of the network. It usually takes place during the New Year celebrations.

== EASA Newspaper: Umbrella ==
Each year, during EASA, one of the workshops is dedicated to cover the event by reporting about events and workshops in a newspaper-like fashion. This workshop and hence the newspaper is typically called umbrella, or variation of the local word for umbrella. This newspaper is usually published on a daily basis and has been an integral part of EASA since the early 1980s. In recent years, The Umbrella Workshop has also embraced new media, and has run EASA TV during the event. In 2009 EASA TV was a workshop of its own for the first time, but with integral co-operation with Umbrella.

== EASA TV ==
EASA.TV tries to cover as much of the assembly as possible and the material is then edited, screened on site at the assembly and uploaded online. The participants will learn how to plan episodes, write scripts, draw storyboards, record with DSLR cameras and edit and export with software such as Adobe Premiere Pro. But most of all they will get the chance to document the very essence of EASA, the EASA spirit. Since 2007

== EASA FM ==
EASA FM is a temporary radio station that was started in EASA011, Cadiz/Spain.

== Photo pages ==
- Jelk's EASA page
- Marko's EASA Page
- Flickr
- ...more photo links
