= LifeScan =

Medical equipment company

LifeScan, Enterprises LLC.
- Industry: Medical devices
- Founded: 1981; 45 years ago
- Headquarters: Malvern, Pennsylvania
- Area served: Global
- Revenue: US$1.5 billion (2017)
- Number of employees: 2,400(2020)
- Parent: Canyon Partners and Brigade Capital Management, LP

LifeScan Enterprises LLC. is a diagnostic systems manufacturer with products focusing on the diabetes market, specifically blood glucose monitoring systems. Corporate headquarters in Malvern, Pennsylvania.

== History ==
LifeScan was established in 1981. It was acquired by Johnson & Johnson (J&J) in 1986, and in June 2018, J&J agreed to sell LifeScan to Platinum Equity as part of its strategic exit from the diabetes device market, accepting an offer originally tendered in March 2018. The divestiture completed in October 2018.

LifeScan manufactures and markets the OneTouch Ultra and OneTouch Verio families of products for home use. The company philosophy is to "create a world without limits for people with diabetes." During its existence, LifeScan revolutionized blood glucose monitoring by introduction of its "One Touch" systems. Originally, the measurement was made using a test strip which changed color depending on the glucose content of a blood sample, and LifeScan rose to become the world-leading producer of such systems in the early 1990s. Later, the measurement technology was changed to electrochemistry, but LifeScan maintained a leading position in the industry.

LifeScan has facilities in Inverness, Scotland; and Cabo Rojo, Puerto Rico. Animas Corporation of West Chester, Pennsylvania, which produced insulin pumps for people with diabetes, was acquired by Johnson & Johnson in 2006 and now closed, reported to LifeScan.

LifeScan, which employed 2400 people as of early 2018, was the central part of J&J's diabetes device business. J&J announced plans to exit from the diabetes device market in 2017, including divesting LifeScan. In January 2018, there were reports of Chinese investors expressing interest in purchasing the company for US$3 to 4 billion, while in March, Platinum Equity offered the far smaller sum of US$2.1 billion for the unit.

On July 15, 2025, LifeScan filed for Chapter 11 bankruptcy protection as part of a plan to be taken over by its creditors. The company listed assets and liabilities between $1 billion and $10 billion. LifeScan Enterprises LLC. emerged from bankruptcy on December 8, 2025, now operating under LifeScan Enterprises LLC. formerly LifeScan, Inc.
