= Gordon Murray & Alan Dunlop Architects =

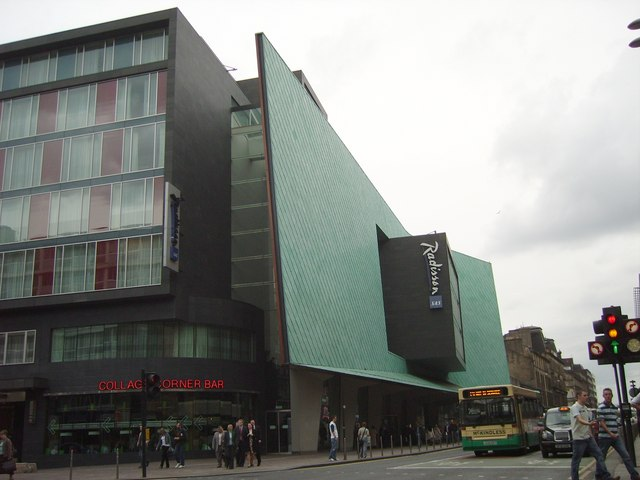
Radisson Hotel, Glasgow

Gordon Murray & Alan Dunlop Architects, abbreviated to Murray Dunlop and gm+ad, was an architecture practice based in Glasgow, Scotland. It was founded by Gordon Murray and Alan Dunlop in 1996, and was dissolved April 2010.

== Works ==
The practice was responsible for a number of housing and business developments in Glasgow and Edinburgh, including the copper-clad Radisson Hotel on Glasgow's Argyle Street, and the steel-clad Spectrum Building on Blythswood Street. On a smaller scale, the practice designed an artists' retreat for the grounds of Dunderave Castle in Argyll, involving re-use of cottages designed by Robert Lorimer.

The practice published two books of their work, Challenging Contextualism (2003) and Curious Rationalism (2006), and won multiple architectural awards and prizes.

== Partners ==
Gordon Murray is from Airdrie in North Lanarkshire and studied at the University of Strathclyde School of Architecture. He was appointed Professor of Architecture and Urban Design at the University of Strathclyde in 2007. Murray was awarded the Royal Scottish Academy medal in 1990. He was president of the Royal Incorporation of Architects in Scotland from 2003 to 2005, and is a trustee of The Lighthouse and a member of the Design Review Panel of Architecture and Design Scotland.

Alan Dunlop was educated at the Mackintosh School of Architecture, Glasgow School of Art. He has taught architecture in Manchester, Liverpool and Glasgow and is a visiting professor at the Scott Sutherland School of Architecture at Robert Gordon University, Aberdeen. In 2010 he was the Regnier Visiting Chair of Architecture at Kansas State University, and the Mahlum Endowed Lecturer at the Department of Architecture, University of Washington, Seattle. He resigned from the editorial board of Prospect after Glasgow Harbour, a scheme in which gm+ad were involved, was nominated for the magazine's "Carbuncle Award".

Since the dissolution of the partnership, both Murray and Dunlop have continued to practice and teach architecture. Professor Alan Dunlop is a Visiting Professor of Architecture and Hon. Chair in Contemporary Architectural Practice at the University of Liverpool and Visiting Professor of Architecture at Robert Gordon University.
