= Potterrow Student Centre =

Students' union building in Edinburgh, Scotland

Coordinates: 55°56′46″N 3°11′17″W

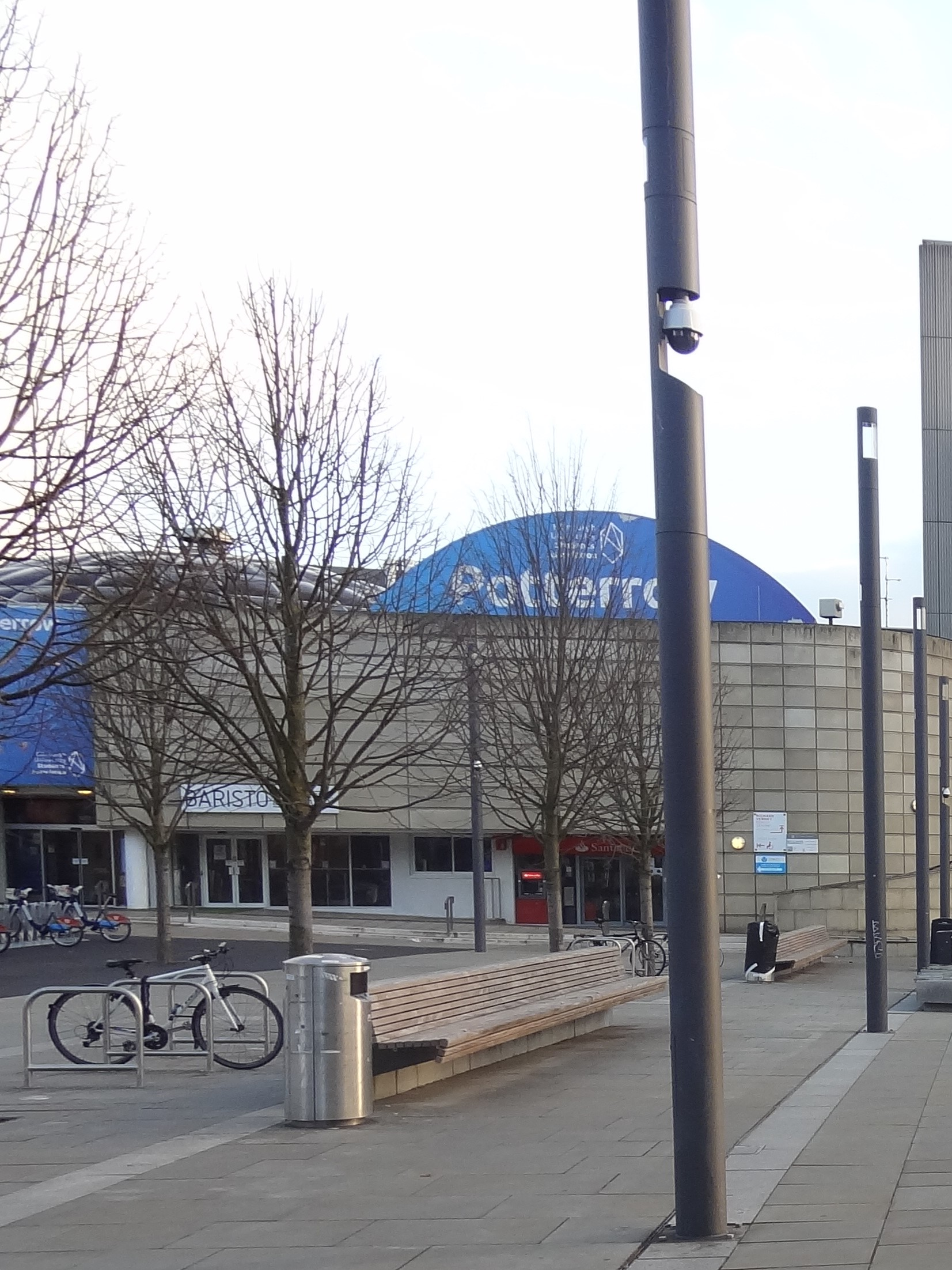
- Potterrow in 2018
- Interactive map of the Potterrow Student Centre area
- Alternative names: Potterrow Mandela Centre

General information
- Type: Students' union building
- Location: Bristo Square, Edinburgh, EH8 9AL
- Completed: 1973
- Owner: University of Edinburgh

Design and construction
- Architecture firm: Morris and Steedman

The Potterrow Mandela Centre or Potterrow Student Centre is operated by Edinburgh University Students' Association in Edinburgh, Scotland.

== Site and architecture ==
The name "Potterrow" recalls a medieval suburb which stood outside the town walls. Its Victorian buildings and street layout disappeared when the university demolished the area for redevelopment in the mid-1960s. With its distinctive large Plexiglas dome, the building was designed by architects Morris and Steedman and completed in 1973. The centre was refurbished in 2012.

== Use ==
Potterrow contains a variety of student entertainment and support services including a shop, a bank, two cafés, Edinburgh's largest nightclub, the university's Chaplaincy, The Advice Place, and the main EUSA offices. In 1986, students voted to rename the centre in honour of imprisoned anti-apartheid revolutionary Nelson Mandela.

During the Edinburgh Festival Fringe in August, the building is used as a comedy venue under the name Pleasance Dome with five performing spaces, operated by the Pleasance Theatre Trust.

== Gallery ==
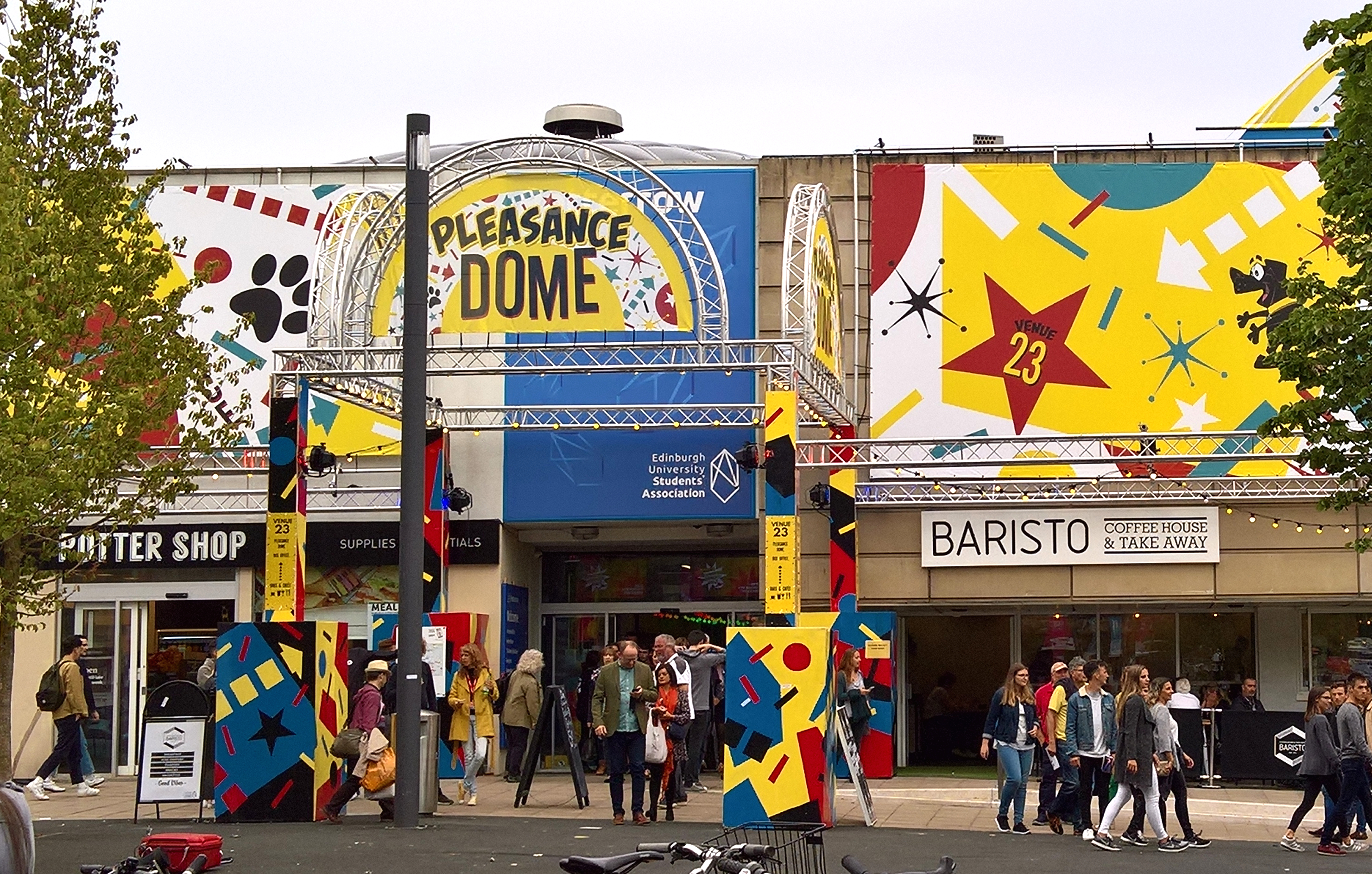
Potterrow as the 'Pleasance Dome' during the 2018 Fringe Festival

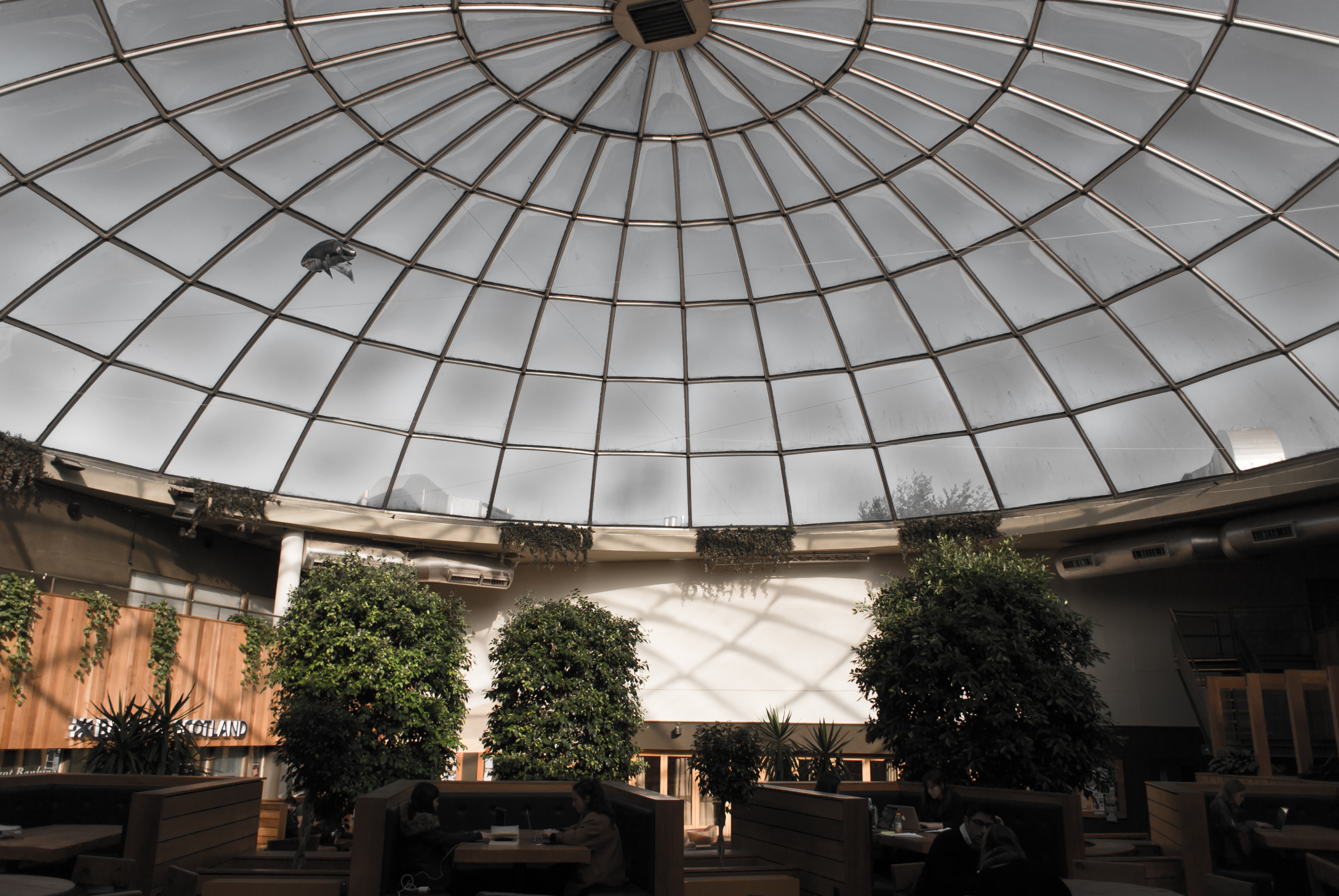
Interior and dome in 2014 following renovations

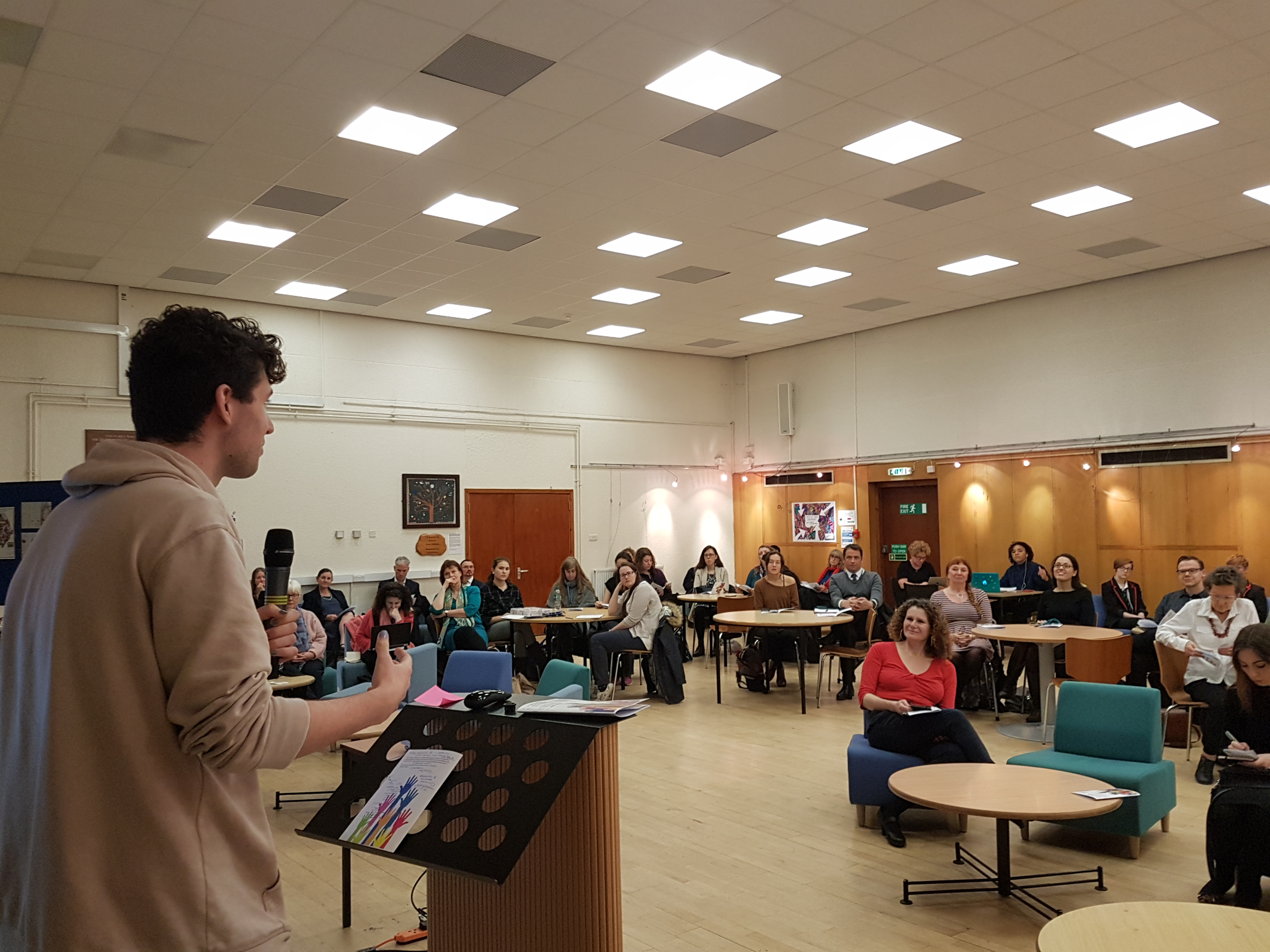
The University Chaplaincy in 2017

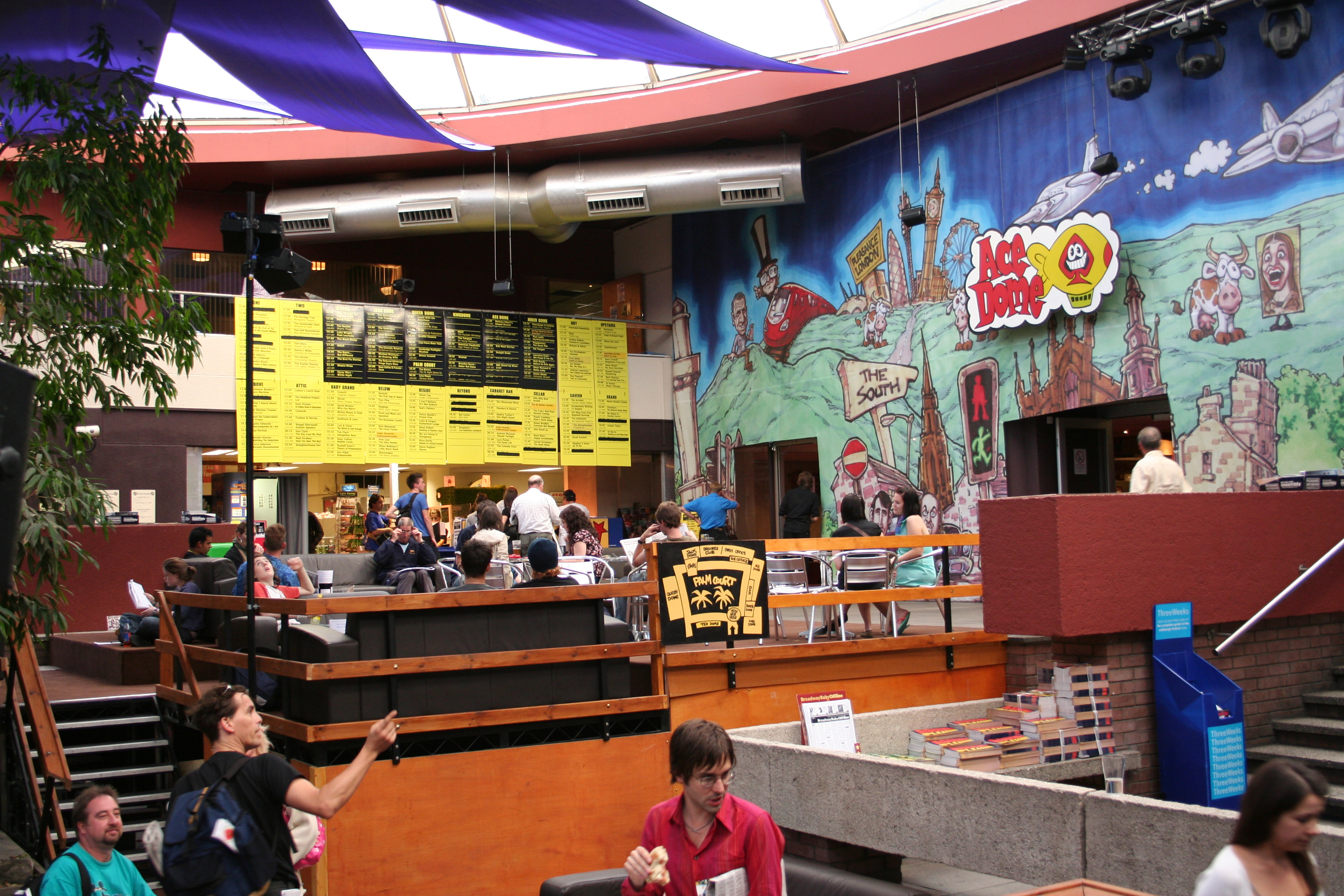
Festival Fringe interior in 2006
