= Scottish Storytelling Centre =

Arts Venue in Edinburgh, Scotland

Coordinates: 55°57′03″N 3°11′05″W

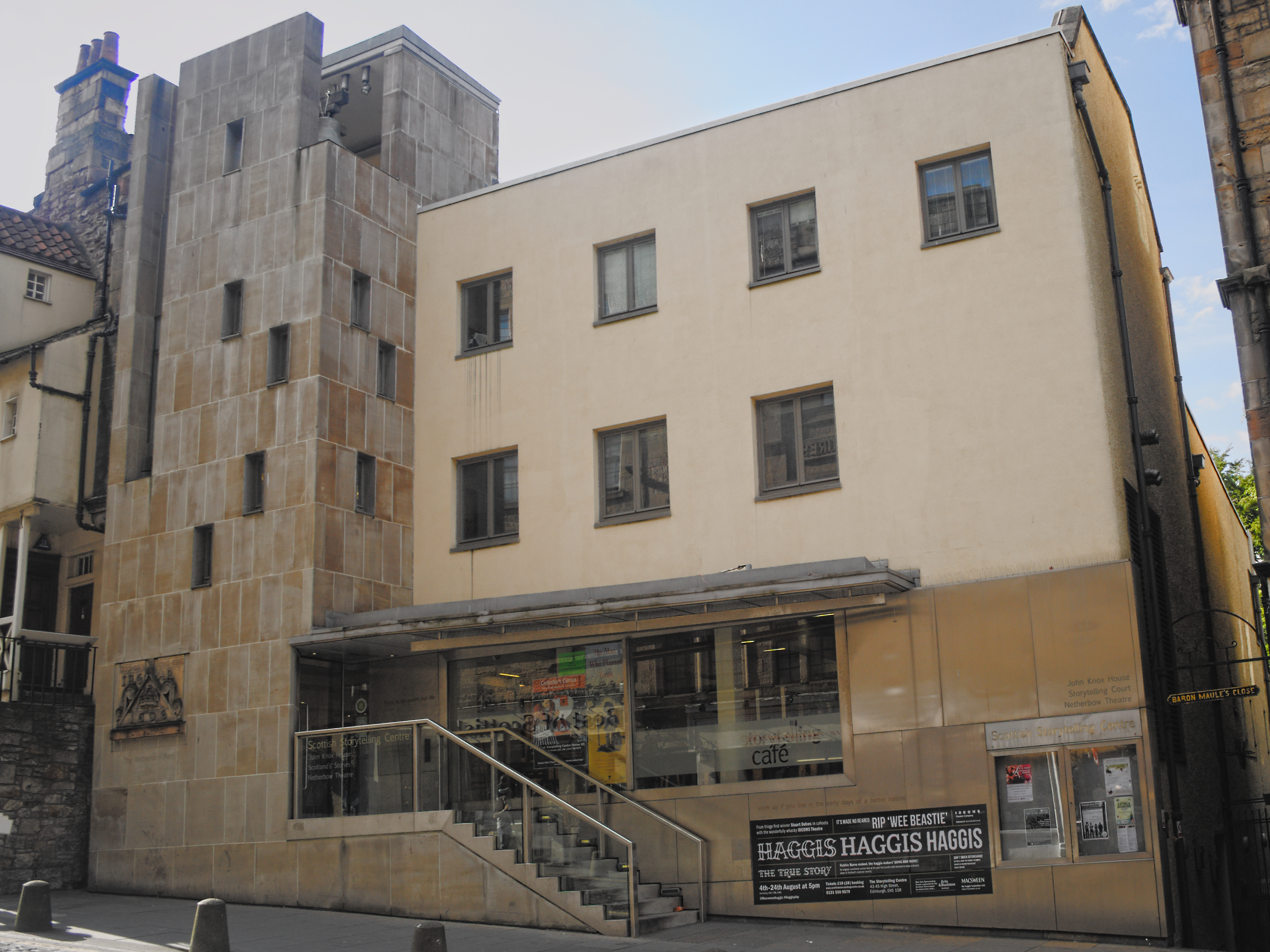
The Scottish Storytelling Centre on Edinburgh's High street. Adjacent to John Knox's House.

The Scottish Storytelling Centre, the world's first purpose-built modern centre for live storytelling, is located on the High Street in Edinburgh's Royal Mile, Scotland. It was formally opened on 1 June 2006 by Patricia Ferguson MSP, Minister for Culture in the Scottish Executive. Donald Smith, himself a storyteller, playwright, novelist and performance poet, was Director of the Scottish Storytelling Centre from 1989 until his retirement at the end of 2025.

The new building, designed by Malcolm Fraser Architects, replaced the former Netherbow Arts Centre, which itself replaced the Moray-Knox Church, demolished in the 1960s. It incorporates John Knox House.

In June 2016, the Centre celebrated its 10th anniversary, which coincided with a programme of events to mark the 20th anniversary of patron George Mackay Brown's death.

In 2017, the centre was nominated for Best Performing Arts Venue in the Sunday Herald Culture Awards.

== Festivals ==
The Centre presents a substantial programme of events on the Edinburgh Festival Fringe and is home to two annual festivals:

- Scottish International Storytelling Festival
- Edinburgh Tradfest
