= OneTouch Ultra =

Blood glucose monitoring system

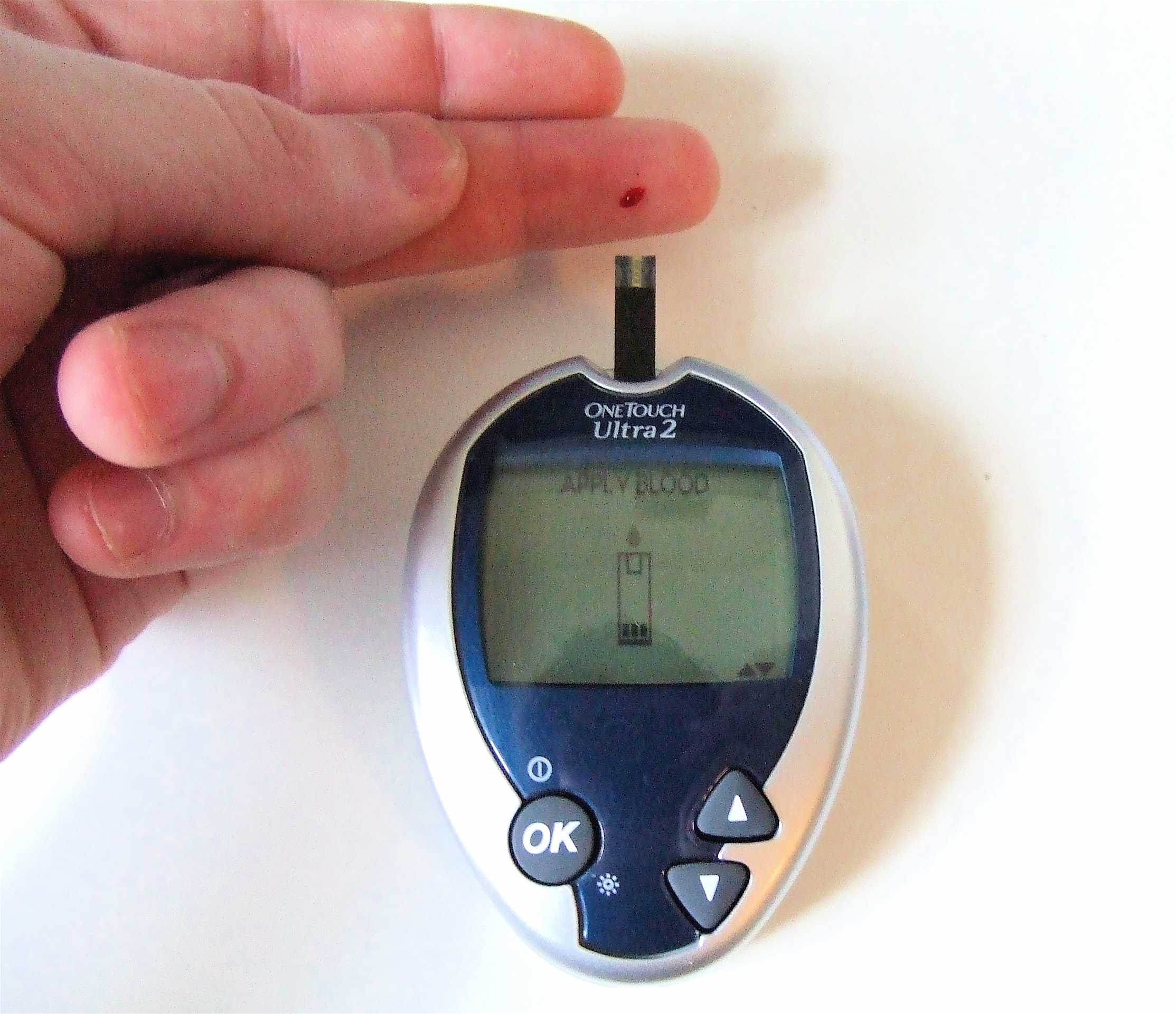
The OneTouch Ultra 2 Meter is being used by a diabetic patient.

OneTouch Ultra is a blood glucose monitoring device for people with diabetes that is manufactured by LifeScan Enterprises LLC. It is the foundation product for LifeScan's OneTouch Ultra family of blood glucose monitoring systems, launched in January 2001, replacing LifeScan's original OneTouch monitors launched in 1987.

OneTouch Ultra blood glucose meters provide blood glucose test results in five seconds. The device offers alternative test site options, as well as various memory and flagging features. The results are displayed as plasma values. It is used to measure glucose levels for both hypoglycemia and hyperglycemia in children and adults.

OneTouch meters are sold in kits containing a carrying case, a lancing device, control solution, sample quantities of lancets, and a replacement cap for use with the sampling device when using alternative site testing.

The OneTouch Ultra 2 Meter is similar in design and operation to the OneTouch Ultra, with features including Before and After Meal Flags, Comments, and a list-style memory recall. This meter also provides 7-day, 14-day, and 30-day averages, with the option of averaging "before meal" or "after meal" records.

Currently, there are four products in the LifeScan OneTouch family: OneTouch Verio Reflect, Verio Flex, Ultra Plus Flex and Ultra 2 blood glucose meters. There are three types of test strips to monitor blood sugar. All meters are code free.

Notable ad campaigns -

- B.B. King had type 2 diabetes for 25 years. He was in an ad campaign for OneTouch Ultra, describing how blue he feels from diabetes. There was also a commercial with him and Matthew Cooper, a young musician from Boulder, Colorado who has had Type 1 Diabetes since age one and also plays blues music. The campaign promoted the use of alternative site testing. King also worked in collaboration with American Idol contestant Crystal Bowersox (who was diagnosed with type 1 diabetes at age six) to spread awareness about diabetes. King and Bowersox were also involved in the LifeFirst diabetes awareness campaign through OneTouch Ultra.
- Patti LaBelle has had diabetes since 1995. She was in an ad campaign for OneTouch Ultra 2 Meter, describing how she collapsed on stage and discovered she had diabetes. Labelle re-recorded her 1980s hit "New Attitude" for one of the commercials.
- OneTouch has in the past been the main shirt sponsor of Inverness Caledonian Thistle, highlighting LifeScan's presence as a major employer in the city.
