= Gareth Hoskins =

Scottish architect (1967–2016)

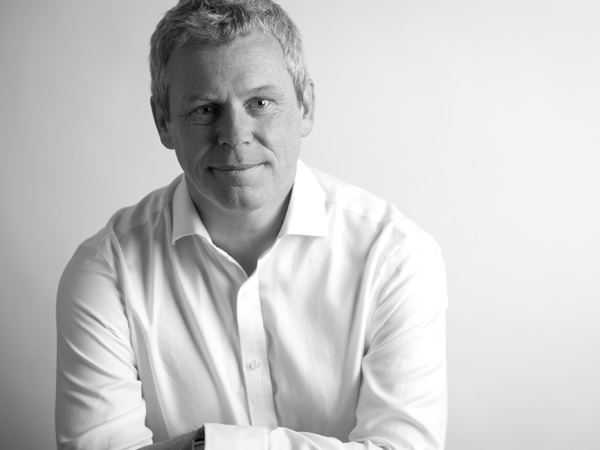
- Hoskins, in Glasgow, September 2013
- Born: 15 April 1967; Edinburgh
- Died: 9 January 2016 (aged 48); Edinburgh
- Education: Glasgow School of Art
- Occupation: Architect

Gareth Dale Hoskins OBE (15 April 1967 – 9 January 2016) was a Scottish architect.

== Biography ==
Born in Edinburgh on 15 April 1967, Hoskins attended George Watson’s College and the Mackintosh School of Architecture at the Glasgow School of Art. He joined Penoyre & Prasad in 1992 before starting his own firm in 1998. In 2005 he was appointed to the Board of Architecture + Design Scotland where he served as Scottish Healthcare Design Champion for 4 years from 2006.

== Personal ==
Hoskins was married, had two children and lived in Helensburgh. He had a heart attack on 3 January 2016 while taking part in a fencing competition, and died six days later at the Edinburgh Royal Infirmary.

== Projects ==
- National Museum of Scotland redesign
- Scottish National Gallery Scottish Collection Gallery Redevelopment
- Victoria & Albert Museum entrance and the Architecture Gallery and Exhibition spaces
- Old Royal High School hotel (rejected)
- World Museum, Vienna
- Aberdeen Art Gallery redesign
- National Theatre of Scotland
- St Peter's Seminary, Cardross (with Urban Splash)
- Mareel
- Edinburgh Castle ticket office
- Mackintosh Interpretation Centre at The Lighthouse, Glasgow

== Awards and honours ==
In 2000, Building Design gave Hoskins its Young Architect of the Year Award. He was named UK Architect of the Year in 2006 and Scottish Architect of the Year three years later. In 2010, he was made an Officer of the Order of the British Empire for services to architecture. Shortly after his death Argyll and Bute Council announced that the renovation of Hermitage Park in Helensburgh will be dedicated to his memory as he was the project architect.
