= Richard Murphy (architect) =

British architect (born 1955)

Richard John Murphy OBE (born 24 April 1955) is a British architect and businessman. He is the founder and principal architect of Richard Murphy Architects, an architectural firm that operated in Edinburgh until being wound up in November 2026. He won the 2016 RIBA House of the year.

== Works ==
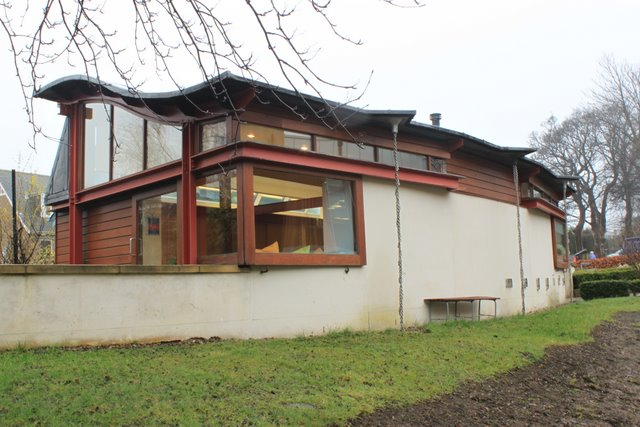
Maggie's Centre, Edinburgh

Murphy studied at Newcastle University and University of Edinburgh. In 1991, he established Richard Murphy Architects in Edinburgh, which expanded to employ over twenty architects. Initially focused on residential extensions and mews conversions, the firm later branched into education, healthcare, arts, and commercial projects, with some buildings funded by the National Lottery.

In 1995, Murphy designed the inaugural Maggie's Centre in Edinburgh, now the administrative headquarters for Maggie's. The structure, intended to support cancer treatment, was uniquely designed without corridors to prevent an institutional feel.

In 1996, Murphy published a book on Venetian architect Carlo Scarpa and presented a Channel 4 documentary on him. He also co-authored a book on Charles Rennie Mackintosh.

In 2004, Murphy showcased his work at the Venice Biennale.

Richard Murphy (front row, 2nd from right) at the Venice Biennale, 2004

In the 2007 New Year Honours, he was awarded an OBE for his contributions to architecture.

Murphy has designed homes for his personal use, with his 2015 Hart Street residence winning the Saltire Society Award for Best Single Dwelling New Build.

Murphy House at Hart Street, Edinburgh

In November 2026, Richard Murphy Architects entered liquidation after 35 years in business, blaming the unexpected termination in August 2026 of a major project, the absence of design competitions and a "box-ticking" system of public procurement for its demise.

Dunfermline Carnegie Library and Museum

== Teaching ==
Murphy has taught at University of Edinburgh, The Scott Sutherland School of Architecture, University of Strathclyde, and outside the UK at Technical University of Braunschweig, University of Virginia, and Syracuse University, New York.

== Proposed work ==
- Candleriggs Quarter in Glasgow's Merchant City
- Perth Theatre, Perthshire

== Selected work ==
Projects by year of design

- Fruitmarket Gallery, Edinburgh, 1991
- Maggie's Edinburgh, Edinburgh, 1994 + 1999 extension
  - Nominated for 1997 Stirling Prize
- Dundee Contemporary Arts, Dundee, 1996
- Eastgate Theatre & Arts Centre, Peebles, 1998
  - Nominated for 2004 RIAS Best Building in Scotland
- Caernarfon Arts Centre, Wales, 2000
- Olorosso Restaurant, Edinburgh, 2001
- John Muir's Birthplace, Dunbar, East Lothian, 2001
- Computer Centre, Merchiston Campus, Edinburgh Napier University, 2001
- Tolbooth Arts Centre, Stirling, 2002
- British High Commission, Sri Lanka, 2008
- Housing Moore Street, Glasgow, 2008
- University of East London - Computer and Conference Centre, London, 2009
- Stratheden Dementia and Mental Health Unit, Fife, 2009
- Justice Mill Lane Park Inn Hotel and Office Development, Aberdeen, 2011
- Queen's University Belfast Postgraduate Accommodation, Belfast, 2012
- Old See House Mental Health Facility (in association with RPP Architects), Belfast, 2014
- Postgraduate Housing for the University of Edinburgh, 2014
- Dunfermline Museum and Art Gallery, Fife, 2017

== See also ==
- European Architecture Students Assembly
