= Mount Stuart visitor centre =

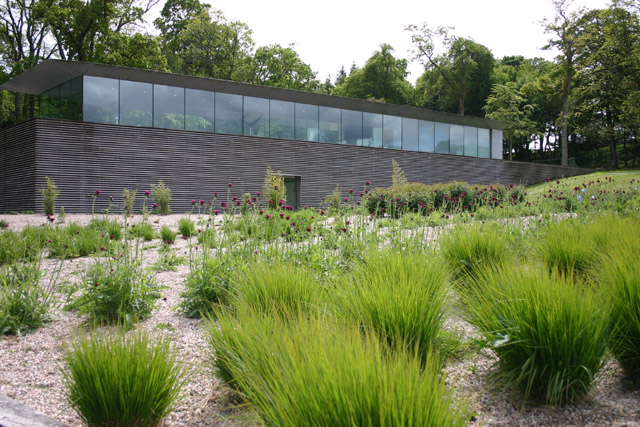
- Interactive map of the Mount Stuart visitor centre area

General information
- Coordinates: 55°48′01″N 5°01′33″W

Design and construction
- Architect: Alfred Munkenbeck
- Architecture firm: Munkenbeck + Marshall

The Mount Stuart visitor centre on the Bute estate, near Rothsay on the Island of Bute was designed by the architect Alfred Munkenbeck of Munkenbeck + Marshall, and was opened by Richard Attenborough in June 2001.

== Awards ==
RIBA Award in 2002.
