= Urban Realm =

Planning magazine published in Scotland

- Winter 2007 cover
- Frequency: Quarterly
- Circulation: 4,000
- Publisher: Urban Realm Ltd
- Founder: Royal Incorporation of Architects in Scotland
- Founded: 1922
- Country: Scotland
- Language: English
- Website: http://www.urbanrealm.com

Urban Realm is a planning magazine published in Scotland, with a focus on Scottish issues. The magazine was established as Prospect in 1922 by the Royal Incorporation of Architects in Scotland, and is the oldest architectural magazine in Scotland. It was rebranded as Urban Realm in 2009 to reflect the wider environment in which architecture operates, covering policy, planning, engineering, and strategic issues, as well as new buildings. It is currently published by Urban Realm Ltd.

== Carbuncle Awards ==
Intermittently from 2000-2015, the magazine promoted the Carbuncle Awards, which were aimed at highlighting poor design and planning in Scotland. The awards comprised the "Plook on the Plinth" award for "most dismal town", the "Pock Mark" award for the worst planning decision, and the "Zit Building" award for Scotland's most disappointing new building.

In 2005, the magazine published a list of the 100 best modern Scottish buildings.

Coatbridge in North Lanarkshire famously won the Carbuncle Award in 2007.
