= Garden of Cosmic Speculation =

Sculpture garden in Dumfriesshire, Scotland

Coordinates: 55.12978°N 3.66583°W

Designations

Inventory of Gardens and Designed Landscapes in Scotland
- Official name: The Garden of Cosmic Speculation (Portrack)
- Designated: 21 September 2025
- Reference no.: GDL00417

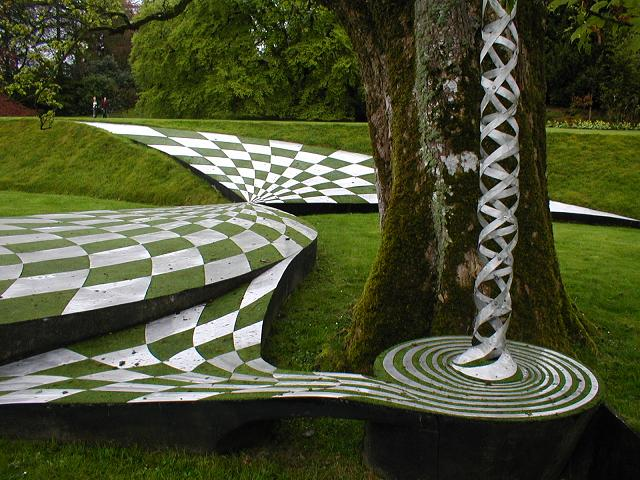
Black Hole

The Garden of Cosmic Speculation is a 30 acre (12 hectare) sculpture garden created by landscape architect and theorist Charles Jencks and his wife, Maggie Keswick Jencks, on Maggie's land and their home together, Portrack House, in Dumfriesshire, Scotland. Like much of Jencks' work, the garden is inspired by modern cosmology.

== History ==
=== Features ===
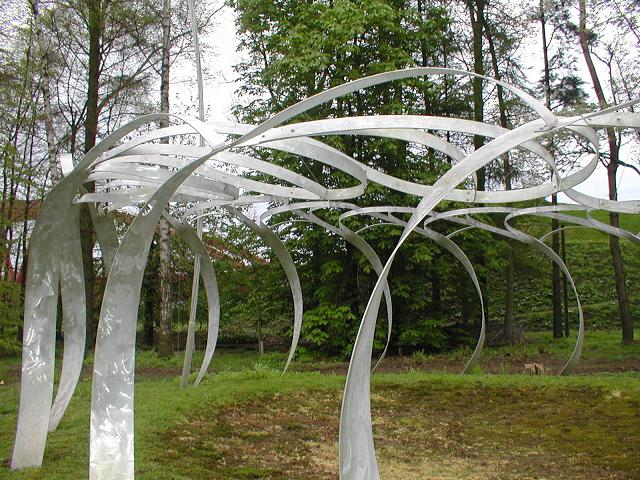
Willowtwist, an aluminium sculpture by Charles Jencks

The garden is inspired by science and mathematics, with sculptures and landscaping on these themes, such as black holes, fractals, and DNA. The garden is not abundant with plants, but sets mathematical formulae and scientific phenomena in a setting which elegantly combines natural features and artificial symmetry and curves. It is probably unique among gardens, drawing comparisons with a similarly abstract garden in Scotland, Little Sparta.

=== Access ===
The garden is private but usually opens for only six hours on two days each year for 1500 ticket holders through the Scotland's Gardens programme and raises money for Maggie's Centres, a cancer care charity named for Maggie Keswick Jencks, the late wife of Charles Jencks.

=== Depiction in music ===
The garden is the subject of an orchestral composition by American composer, Michael Gandolfi, which he composed for a joint commission from the Boston Symphony Orchestra and the Tanglewood Music Center. The piece was subsequently recorded by the Atlanta Symphony Orchestra conducted by Robert Spano, and nominated for "Best Contemporary Classical Composition" at the 2009 Grammy Awards.

=== In literature ===
Louise Penny uses The Garden of Cosmic Speculation as an important plot device in her tenth Inspector Gamache mystery, The Long Way Home (St. Martin Press, 2014).

Cameron Jace makes creative use of The Garden of Cosmic Speculation in his fictional novel titled Circus, which is the third installment of his Insanity series. In the book, Jace uses many facts when referring to 'public' knowledge of the garden (per character conversation), but changed the name of the designer to better fit into the story's plot line.

== See also ==
- Crawick Multiverse
- Jupiter Artland
- Land art
