= Maggies =

Maggies may refer to:

- Collingwood Football Club, Australian rules football club
- Maggies Centre, a charity in the United Kingdom and Hong Kong
