= Charles Jencks =

American architect (1939–2019)

Charles Alexander Jencks
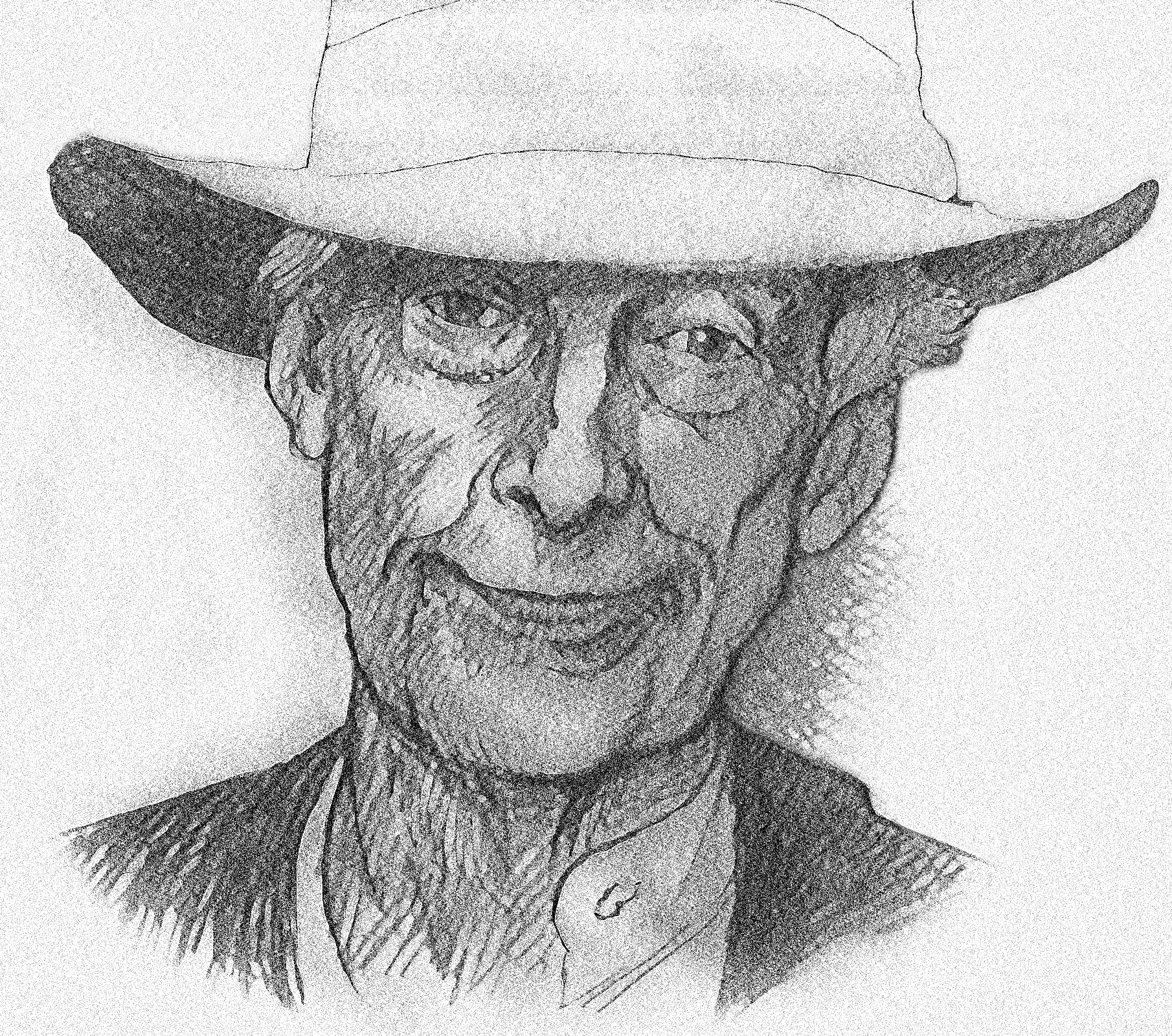
- Born: June 21, 1939; Baltimore, Maryland, U.S.
- Died: October 13, 2019 (aged 80)
- Occupations: American cultural theorist, historian
- Spouses: Pamela Balding (m. 1961; div. 1973) Maggie Keswick Jencks (m. 1978; died 1995) Louisa Lane Fox (m. 2006)
- Children: 4

Charles Alexander Jencks (June 21, 1939 – October 13, 2019) was an American cultural theorist, landscape designer, architectural historian, and co-founder of the Maggie's Cancer Care Centres. He published over thirty books and became famous in the 1980s as a theorist of postmodernism. Jencks identified himself as "a critic who architects" and experimented with his theories through built work including his own home, The Cosmic House. Jencks also devoted time to landform architecture, especially in Scotland. These landscapes include the Garden of Cosmic Speculation and earthworks at Jupiter Artland outside Edinburgh. His continuing project Crawick Multiverse, commissioned by the Duke of Buccleuch, opened in 2015 near Sanquhar.

== Early years and family life ==
Born in Baltimore, Maryland, on June 21, 1939, Charles Alexander Jencks was the son of composer Gardner Platt Jencks and Ruth DeWitt Pearl. Jencks attended Brooks School in North Andover, Massachusetts, and received his Bachelor of Arts degree in English literature at Harvard University in 1961 and a Master of Arts degree in architecture from the Harvard Graduate School of Design in 1965. In 1965 Jencks moved to the United Kingdom where he had houses in Scotland and London. In 1970, Jencks received a PhD in architectural history, studying under the noted historian Reyner Banham at University College, London. This thesis was the source for his Modern Movements in Architecture (1973) which used semiotics and other literary critical methods to study twentieth century architecture.

Jencks married Pamela Balding in 1961 and the marriage ended in 1973. They had two sons: one works as a landscape architect in Shanghai, while the other works for Jardines in Vietnam. He married secondly to Maggie Keswick Jencks, daughter of Sir John Keswick and Clare Elwes, by whom he had two children: John Keswick Jencks, a London-based filmmaker, married to Amy Agnew, and Lily Clare Jencks, an architect who married Roger Keeling in 2014. Jencks married Louisa Lane Fox as his third wife in 2006, and was thus the stepfather of her son Henry Lane Fox and daughter Martha Lane Fox.

== Architectural design ==
Jencks' first architectural design was a studio in the woods made of mass-produced elements assembled around a garage structure, which he named The Garagia Rotunda. He had it built in 1975 in Truro on Cape Cod, where he spent part of the summers with his family, for $5,000. It illustrated the ad hoc use of readymade materials that Jencks had championed in his polemical book with Nathan Silver, Adhocism: the case for improvisation, in 1972. Jencks' architectural designs experimented with ideas from complexity theory.

Jencks designed his own London house in tandem with Maggie Keswick and postmodern architect Terry Farrell, as well as collaborators including Michael Graves, Piers Gough, Madelon Vriesendorp, Eduardo Paolozzi, and Allen Jones. Originally named "Thematic House", it was renamed The Cosmic House in 2018 and the garage was converted into a gallery, a step towards opening the building to the public, by the Jencks Foundation, in 2021.

== Maggie's Centres ==
After his second wife Maggie Keswick Jencks died in 1995, after being cared for by cancer nurse Laura Lee. Laura left the NHS to be "the driving force" as CEO of the Maggie's Centres. She was made a Dame for her work. Based on the notion of self-help and the fact that cancer patients are often involved in a long, drawn-out struggle, the centres provide social and psychological help in an attractive setting next to large hospitals. Their architecture, landscape, and art are designed to support both patients and caregivers and to give dignity to those who, in the past, often hid their disease. Jencks helped co-found the Maggie's Cancer Caring Centres.

Maggie Keswick Jencks and Alison Hardie are the author of the book The Chinese Garden, on which her husband also worked.

== Landscape architecture and landforms ==
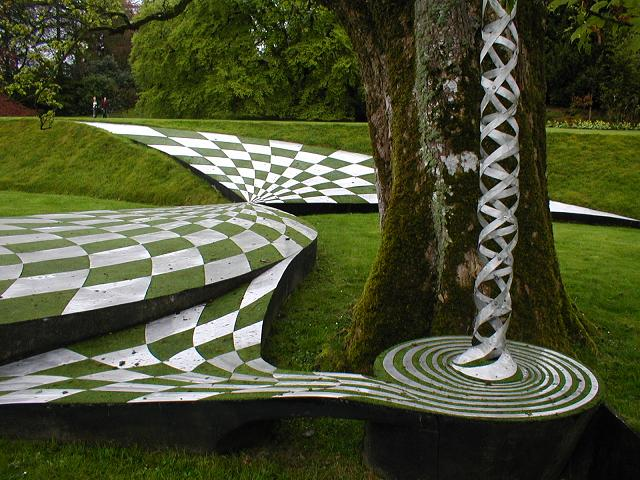
Black Hole in the Garden of Cosmic Speculation

Jencks switched to landscape design as a site for symbolic exploration when Maggie asked Charles to design in the family home and garden in Scotland. The result in 2003 was the Garden of Cosmic Speculation, a series of twenty areas designed around various metaphors such as the DNA garden, Quark Walk, Fractal terrace and Comet Bridge. Further hybrid landforms and symbolic sculptures were built in Edinburgh, Milan, Long Island, New York, Cambridge, Suncheon, South Korea (with Lily Jencks), and other countries, some works from which were published in The Universe in The Landscape, 2011.

From 2010, Jencks started work on the Crawick Multiverse, a fifty-five-acre site in southwest Scotland and completed it in 2015.

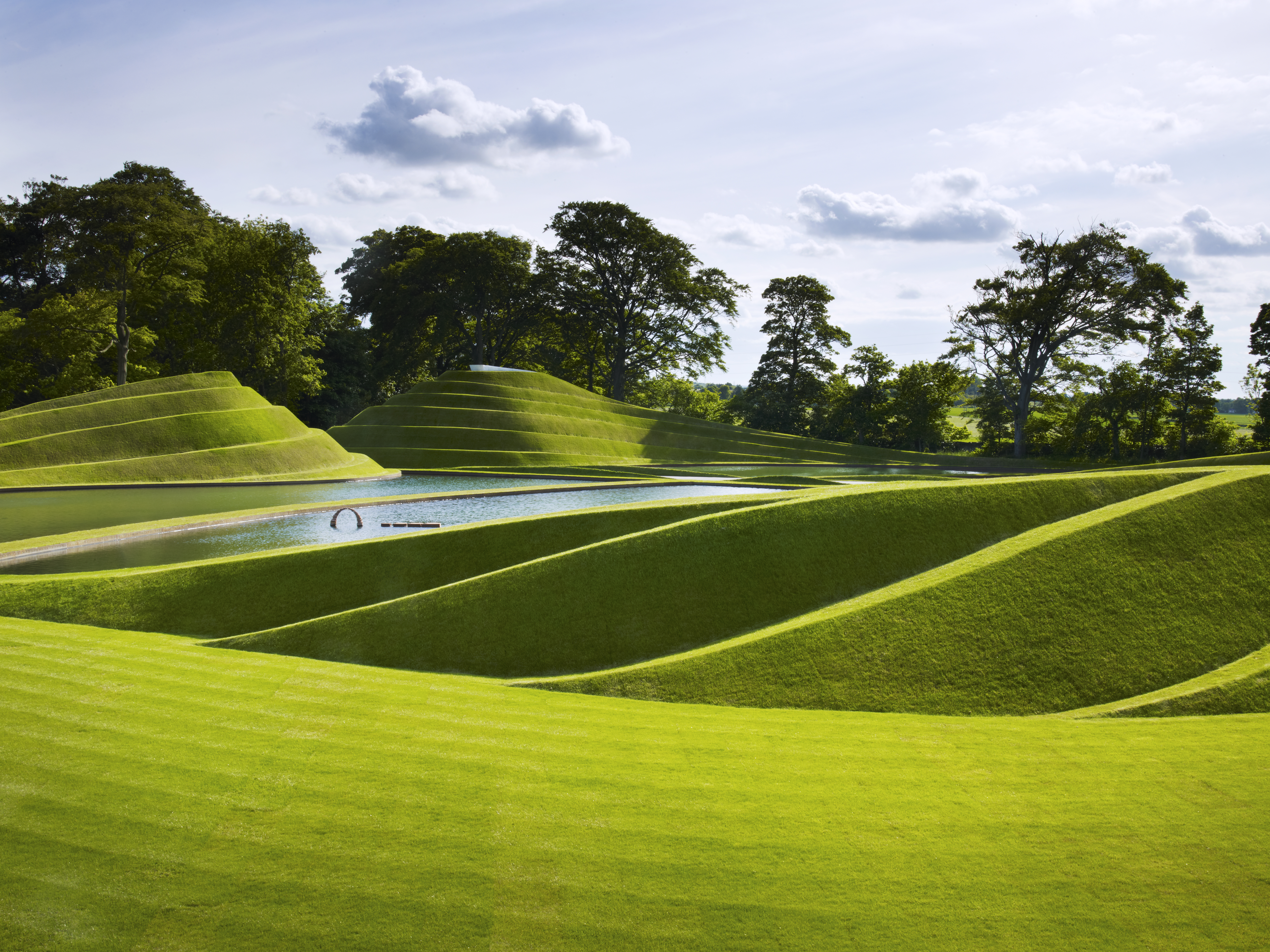
Cells of Life, a landform at Jupiter Artland

The Metaphysical Landscape, was an exhibition of sculpture at Jupiter Artland, 2011. Jencks later exhibited at the Merz Gallery, Sanquhar 2016.

The Garden of Cosmic Speculation, designed in part by Jencks and begun in 1988, was dedicated to Jencks' late wife Maggie Keswick Jencks. Jencks, his wife, scientists, and their friends designed the garden based on natural and scientific processes. Jencks' goal was to celebrate nature, but he also incorporated elements from the modern sciences into the design. The garden contains species of plants that are pleasurable to the eye, as well as edible. Preserving paths and the traditional beauty of the garden was still his concern, however Jencks enhanced the cosmic landscape using new tools and artificial materials. Just as Japanese Zen gardens, Persian paradise gardens, and the English and French Renaissance gardens were analogies for the universe, the design represents the cosmic and cultural evolution of the contemporary world. The garden is a microcosm – as one walks through the gardens they experience the universe in miniature. According to Jencks, gardens are also autobiographical because they reveal the happiest moments, the tragedies, and the truths of the owner and family.

As the garden developed, so too did such sciences as cosmology, and this allowed a dynamic interaction between the unfolding universe, an unfolding science, and a questioning design. Jencks believed that contemporary science is potentially a great moving force for creativity, because it tells us the truth about the way the universe is and shows us the patterns of beauty. As explained in his book The Universe in the Landscape (2011), his work is content-driven. His many landforms are based on the idea that landform building is a radical hybrid activity combining gardens, landscape, urbanism, architecture, sculpture, and epigraphy. Thus, the landforms often include enigmatic writing and complex symbolism. They provoke the visitor to interpret landscape on the largest and smallest scale.

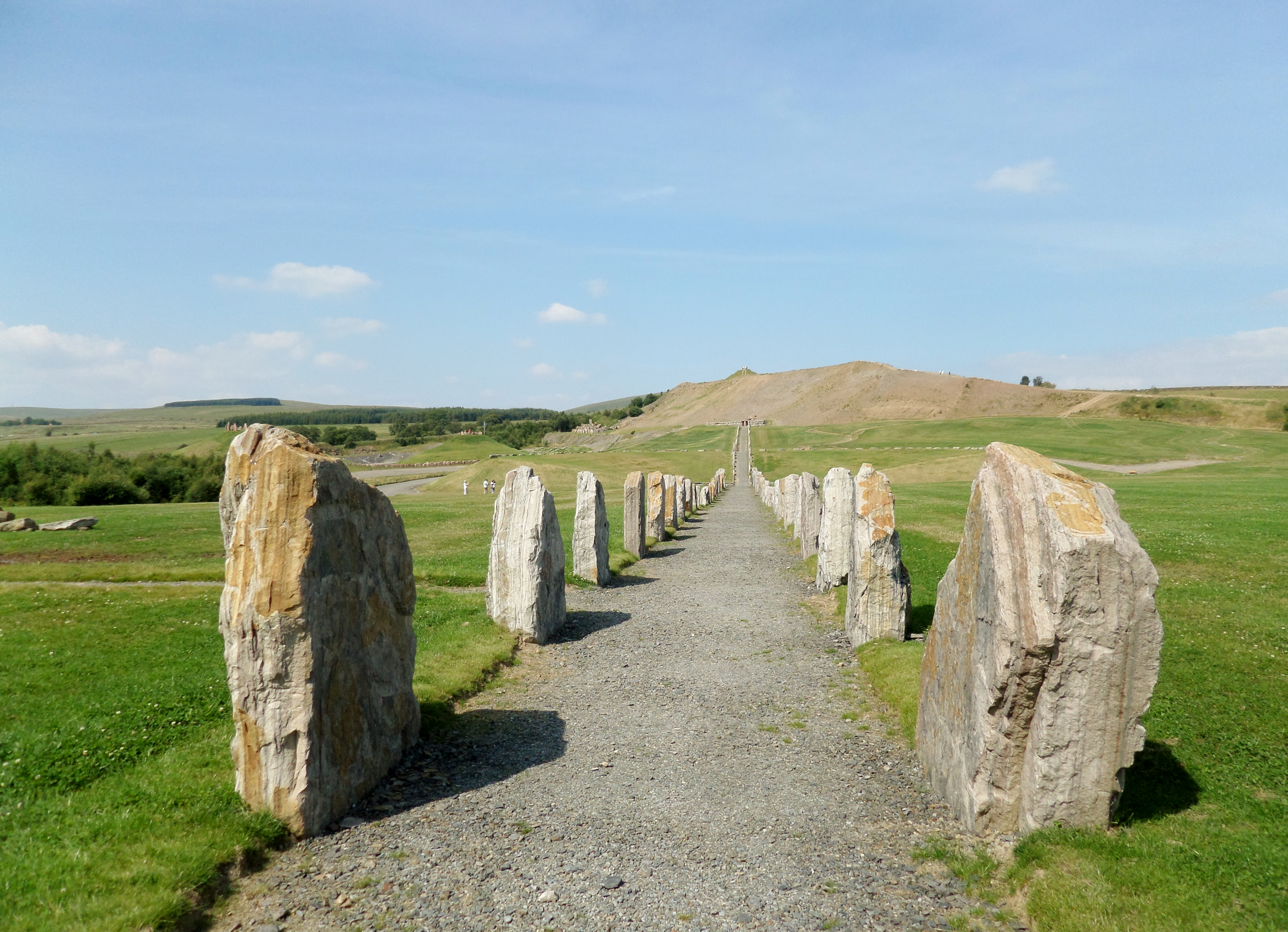
Stone rows on the 'North-South Line' at the Crawick Multiverse

Jencks became a leading figure in British landscape architecture. His landscape work was inspired by black holes, fractals, genetics, chaos theory, waves and solitons. In Edinburgh, Scotland, he designed the landform at the Scottish National Gallery of Modern Art in collaboration with Terry Farrell and Duncan Whatmore of Terry Farrell and Partners. Jencks' other works include the Garden of Cosmic Speculation at Portrack House near Dumfries; Jencks' work with landforms also inspired the creators of Ariel Foundation Park in Mount Vernon, Ohio Ted Schnormeier was the Project Manager and Robert J. Stovicek was the architect/designer and together they created thirty plus acres of terraces (landforms). Further inspiration was from the 'Mound building' culture of central Ohio. The Adena, Hopewell and Mound building peoples created 'landforms' that still exist today - long before Jencks, Schnormeier or Stovicek were creating anything; Designs for Black Hole Landscape, IUCAA, Pune, India, 2002; Portello Park, Milan 2002–2007 (Time Garden 2004–2007); Two Cells – Inverness Maggie's Centre, 2003–2005; Northumberlandia Landform, 2004; Cells of Life, Jupiter Artland, Bonnington House 2003–2010; Crawick Multiverse, 2006–; Memories of the Future landform and reclamation project, Altdobern, Germany; Wu Chi, Black Hole Oval Terrace, Beijing Olympic Park, 2008; and The Scottish World, St. Ninians, Kelty, 2003, 2010+.

Jencks was also a furniture designer and sculptor, completing DNA sculptures at Kew Gardens in 2003 and Cambridge University in 2005.

== Architectural writing ==
Jencks discussed his theories of postmodern architecture in The Language of Post-Modern Architecture (1977), which ran to seven editions. He examined the paradigm shift from modern to postmodern architecture, claiming that modern architecture concentrates on univalent forms such as right angles and square buildings often resembling office buildings. However, postmodern architecture focuses on forms derived from the mind, body, city context, and nature.

Jencks famously remarked—half-jokingly—that modern architecture “died” on July 15, 1972, at precisely 3:32 p.m. This was the moment when several blocks of the Pruitt-Igoe housing complex in St. Louis, Missouri, were demolished. The uniform concrete buildings of the site had long suffered from social and physical decay, and the area had become notorious for crime. Attempts to rehabilitate the complex had failed. Jencks saw this dramatic event not just as the failure of a specific architectural project, but as a symbol of the deeper problems within modernism as a whole.

According to Charles Jencks, modern architecture was characterized by univalent forms, the repetitive use of simple materials, and a focus on function over form. It followed the metaphor of the machine, aiming to express rationality and order. Architects often held utopian ideals, believing architecture could guide social progress. However, Jencks argues that such designs ignored human needs for diversity, symbolism, and community, which ultimately led to the failure of projects like Pruitt-Igoe.

In 2007, he published 'Critical Modernism', the fifth edition of his What is Post-Modernism?

In Meaning in Architecture, 1969, co-edited with George Baird, a hypertext of leading architects and theorists commenting on each other's texts, Jencks addressed issues of who is the ultimate user of architecture, what values should be crystallised in architecture, and what public architecture should represent. This was followed by other anthologies on semiotics.

Jencks was invited by curator Paolo Portoghesi to contribute to The Presence of the Past exhibition at the 1980 Venice Biennale as part of the critic's committee. Jencks also designed a large leaning critic’s pencil sculpture to the "Critic's Corner" of the exhibition hall.

In 1987, Rizzoli published his important interdisciplinary survey of new developments towards a hybrid of classicism or Neo-classicism and modernism in art and architecture "Post-modernism: the new classicism in art and architecture".

His book The Iconic Building explored trend setting and celebrity culture. He claimed that the reason that modern culture seeks the "iconic building" is because it has the possibility of reversing the economic trend of a flagging "conurbation". An iconic building is created to make a splash, to generate money, and the normal criteria of valuation do not apply. He wrote that “enigmatic signifiers” can be used in an effective way to support the deeper meaning of the building.

His book Critical Modernism - Where is Post-Modernism Going? came out in 2007. It is an overview of postmodernism in which Jencks argues that postmodernism is a critical reaction to modernism which comes from within modernism itself. On March 26, 2007, the Royal Academy hosted a debate between Jencks and John N. Gray centered around the book.

The Story of Post-Modernism, Five Decades of the Ironic, Iconic and Critical in Architecture, 2011, summarise the history of the movement since its origins in the 1960s.

=== Other works ===
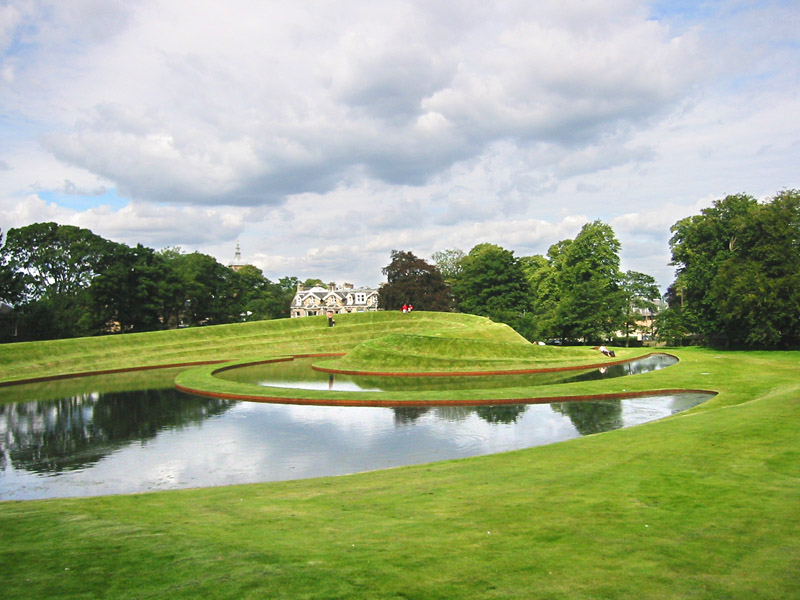
Landform, in the gardens of the Scottish National Gallery of Modern Art, Edinburgh

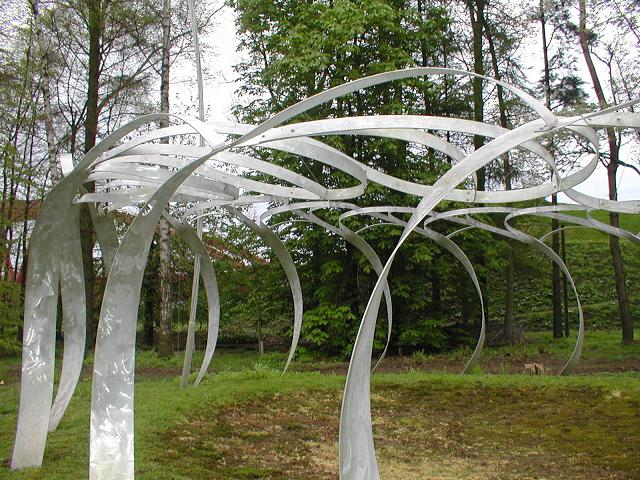
Willowtwist, an aluminium sculpture in the Garden of Cosmic Speculation

- Symbolic Furniture, exhibition, Aram Designs, London, 1985.
- Garagia Rotunda, Truro, Massachusetts, 1976–77.
- The Elemental House (with Buzz Yudell), Los Angeles.
- The Thematic House (with Terry Farrell), London, 1979–84.
- DNA Sculpture for James Watson at Cold Spring Harbor Laboratories, Long Island.
- Landform Ueda, Gallery of Modern Art, Edinburgh, 1999–2002.
- The DNA Spiral, Centre for Life, Newcastle upon Tyne, May 2000.
- The Cell and DNA, Maggie's Centre (Gatehouse), Glasgow, 2002–2003.
- Dividing Cells, Maggie's Centre, Inverness, 2003–2005.
- Wu Chi, Olympic Forest Park, Beijing, 2008.
- Rail Garden of Scottish Worthies, Portrack, Dumfries, 2003–2006.
- Spirals of Time, Parco Portello, Milan, 2002–2012.
- Cells of Life, Jupiter Artland, Bonnington House, Kirknewton, nr Edinburgh, 2003–2010.
- Cosmic Rings of Cern, Cern, Geneva, In Development 2008+ (with Jencks2 ).
- The Scottish World, St Ninians, Kelty, Construction 2010+.
- DoubleWalk, Midpark Hospital, Dumfries, 2010–2012 (with Jencks2 ).
- Northumberlandia, The Lady of the North, Cramlington, 2005–2012.
- Gretna Landmark, Gretna, In Development 2011+ (with Cecil Balmond).
- Holding The Eco-line, Suncheon City, Korea, Construction 2012+ (with Jencks2 ).
- The Crawick Multiverse, Scotland 2015.

== Television ==
Jencks appeared on television programmes in the U.S. and UK, and he wrote two feature films for the BBC (on Le Corbusier, and on Frank Lloyd Wright and Michael Graves).

- Kings of Infinite Space, 1983.
- Symbolic Architecture, 1985.
- Space on Earth, 1986.
- Battle of Paternoster Square, 1987.
- Pride of Place, 1988.
- A Second Chance, 1989.
- Let the People Choose, 1990. BBC Late show.
- New Moderns, 1990.
- La Villette, 1991.
- Tokyo, 1991 (1992 BP Arts Journalism TV Award).
- Libeskind, Jewish Museum, Berlin, 1991.
- Culture Debate, 1991.
- Frank Gehry and Los Angeles, 1992.
- Philip Johnson, The Godfather 1994.
- BBC: Gardens of the Mind. Television programme and conference organised around work-in-progress, New World View, Tokyo and Kyoto, May 1991.
- "The Garden of Cosmic Speculation" (TV film: 50 minutes) 1998.
- Richard Meier The Frame; Daniel Libeskind; The Spiral, 1999.
- Rebuilding the Palace; Frank Lloyd Wright – Tin Gods, 2002.
- Opening of Scottish Parliament for BBC Scotland, October 9, 2004.
- Melvyn Bragg, The South Bank Show, March 2005.
- John Soane, American TV (Murray Grigor) (USA), May 2005.

== Select bibliography ==
- The Architecture of Hope: Maggie's Cancer Caring Centres, 2nd edition, by Charles Jencks, Frances Lincoln, 2015
- The Story of Post-Modernism: Five Decades of the Ironic, Iconic and Critical in Architecture, Wiley, London, 2011 [trad. it.: Postmedia Books, Milano 2014].
- The Universe in the Landscape, Landforms by Charles Jencks, Frances Lincoln, London, 2011.
- The Architecture of Hope - Maggie's Cancer Caring Centres, Frances Lincoln, London, 2010.
- Critical Modernism - Where is Post Modernism Going?, Wiley Academy, London, 2007.
- Theories and Manifestoes of Contemporary Architecture, with Karl Kropf, Academy Press, 2006.
- The Iconic Building - The Power of Enigma, Frances Lincoln, London, 2005.
- The Garden of Cosmic Speculation, Frances Lincoln Limited, London, October 2003.
- The New Paradigm in Architecture, (seventh edition of The Language of Post-Modern Architecture), Yale University Press, London, New Haven, 2002.
- Le Corbusier and the Continual Revolution in Architecture, The Monacelli Press, 2000
- Architecture 2000 and Beyond, (Critique & new predictions for 1971 book), Academy, Wiley, May 2000
- The Architecture of the Jumping Universe, Academy, London & NY, 1995. Second Edition Wiley, 1997.
- Heteropolis - Los Angeles, The Riots & Hetero-Architecture, Academy, London & NY, 1993.
- The New Moderns, Academy London, Rizzoli, NY 1990.
- The Prince, The Architects and New Wave Monarchy, Academy, London and Rizzoli, NY 1988.
- Post-Modernism, The New Classicism in Art and Architecture, Rizzoli, NY and Academy, London 1987; German edition, 1987, reprinted 1988.
- What is Post-Modernism?, St Martins Press, NY 1986, Academy, London 1986. Second Edition 1988. Third Edition 1989. Fourth Edition 1996.
- Towards A Symbolic Architecture, Rizzoli, NY; Academy, London 1985.
- Kings of Infinite Space, St. Martins Press, NY; Academy, London 1983.
- Abstract Representation, St. Martins Press, NY 1983, Architectural Design monograph, London 1983.
- Current Architecture (UK edition), Architecture Today (US edition), Academy Editions, London, 1982.
- Skyscrapers - Skycities, Rizzoli, NY 1980, Academy, London 1980.
- Signs, Symbols and Architecture, edited with Richard Bunt and Geoffrey Broadbent, John Wiley, NY and London 1980.
- Late-Modern Architecture, Rizzoli, NY 1980, Academy, London 1980. Translated into German and Spanish.
- Bizarre Architecture, Rizzoli, NY 1979 and Academy, London 1979.
- The Language of Post-Modern Architecture, Rizzoli, NY 1977, revised 1978, Third Ed. 1980, Fourth Ed. 1984, Fifth Ed. 1988, Sixth Ed. 1991, Academy Editions London 1977, 1978, 1980, 1984, 1991.
- Modern Movements in Architecture, Anchor Press, NY 1973.
- Le Corbusier and the Tragic View of Architecture, Allen Lane, Harmondsworth 1973.
- Adhocism, with Nathan Silver, Doubleday, NY 1972; Reprinted with a new Introduction and new Post-Script, MIT Press, 2013. Translated into French by Pierre Lebrun: Adhocisme, le choix de l'improvisation, Hermann, Paris, 2021.
- Architecture 2000: predictions and methods, Studio Vista, London 1971.
- "Notes on the Complexities of Post-Modernism", in The Fortnightly Review.
