= Holm House and the Crawick Glen =

Coordinates: 55.3804°N 3.9227°W

Holms House and the Crawick Glen
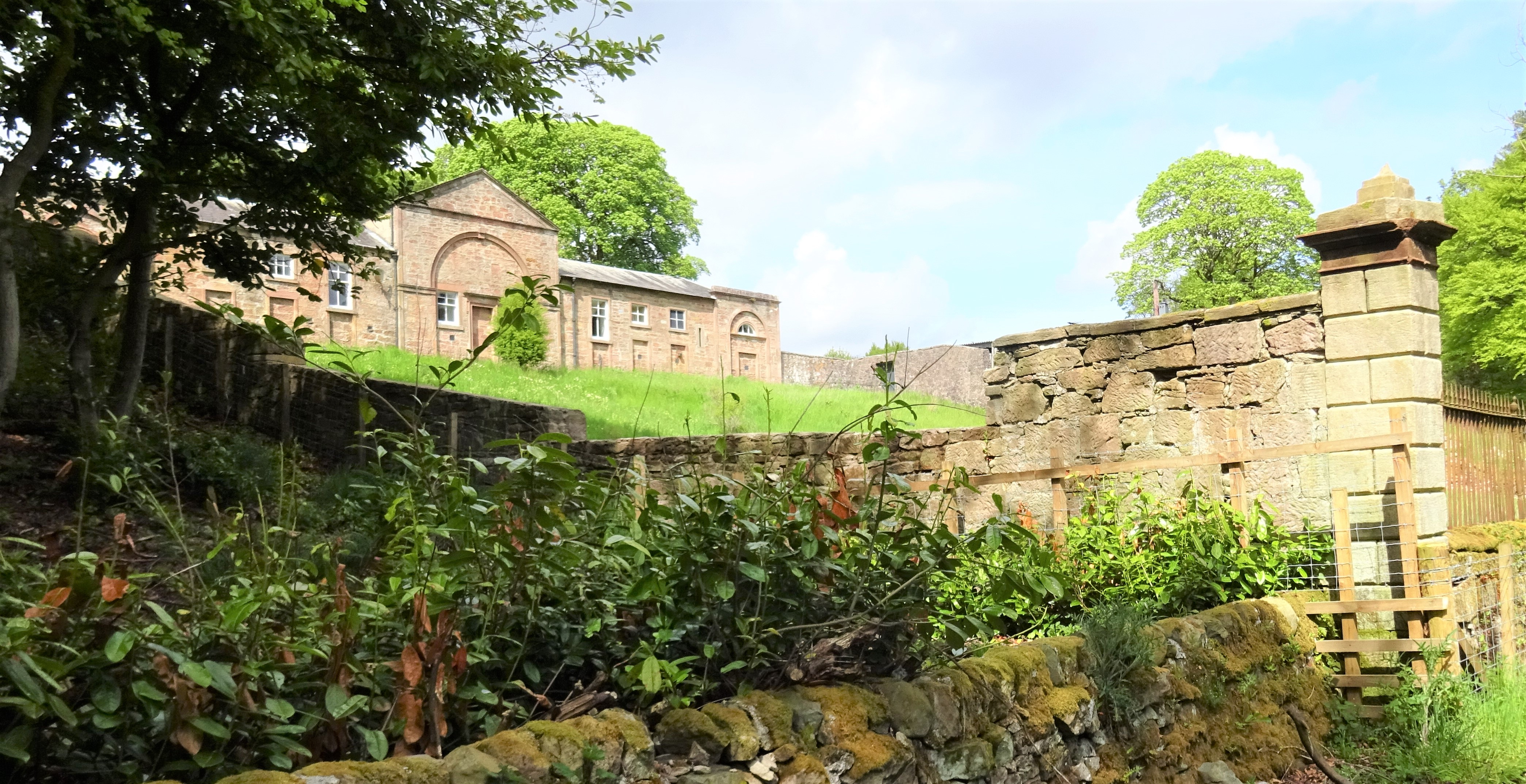
- The old Holm House Stables and Walled Garden

- Location within Dumfries and Galloway
- OS grid reference: NS782112
- Council area: Dumfries and Galloway
- Country: Scotland
- Sovereign state: United Kingdom
- Police: Scotland
- Fire: Scottish
- Ambulance: Scottish
- UK Parliament: Dumfries and Galloway

Holm House and the Crawick Glen were originally part of a small estate in the parishes of Kirkconnel and Sanquhar and lay less than a 1 mile (1.6 km) upstream from the small village of Crawick that itself stands close to the A76 near Sanquhar in Dumfries and Galloway, south-west Scotland.

== History ==
Holm House, The Holm or Crawick Holm was at one time a small estate held by a Mr Mcnab, surrounded by the lands of the Duke of Buccleuch. The lands on the southern side of the Crawick Water were held in lease from the Burgh of Sanquhar and this lease was taken up by the duke when he purchased the rest of the estate from Mr Mcnab.

In the mid 18th century Holm House was described as "A handsome stone building two stories high in good repair with garden and lands attached occupied by Gaven Lindsay, the property of the Duke of Buccleuch" It was located in tranquil surroundings and screened by trees apart from the view across the Crawick Water. A driveway ran up to the road to Crawfordjohn.

The main building, now demolished, was later used as a hunting lodge with substantial stables, kennels, a walled garden and a game larder. The stables are now restored as a private residence.

=== The Game Larder ===
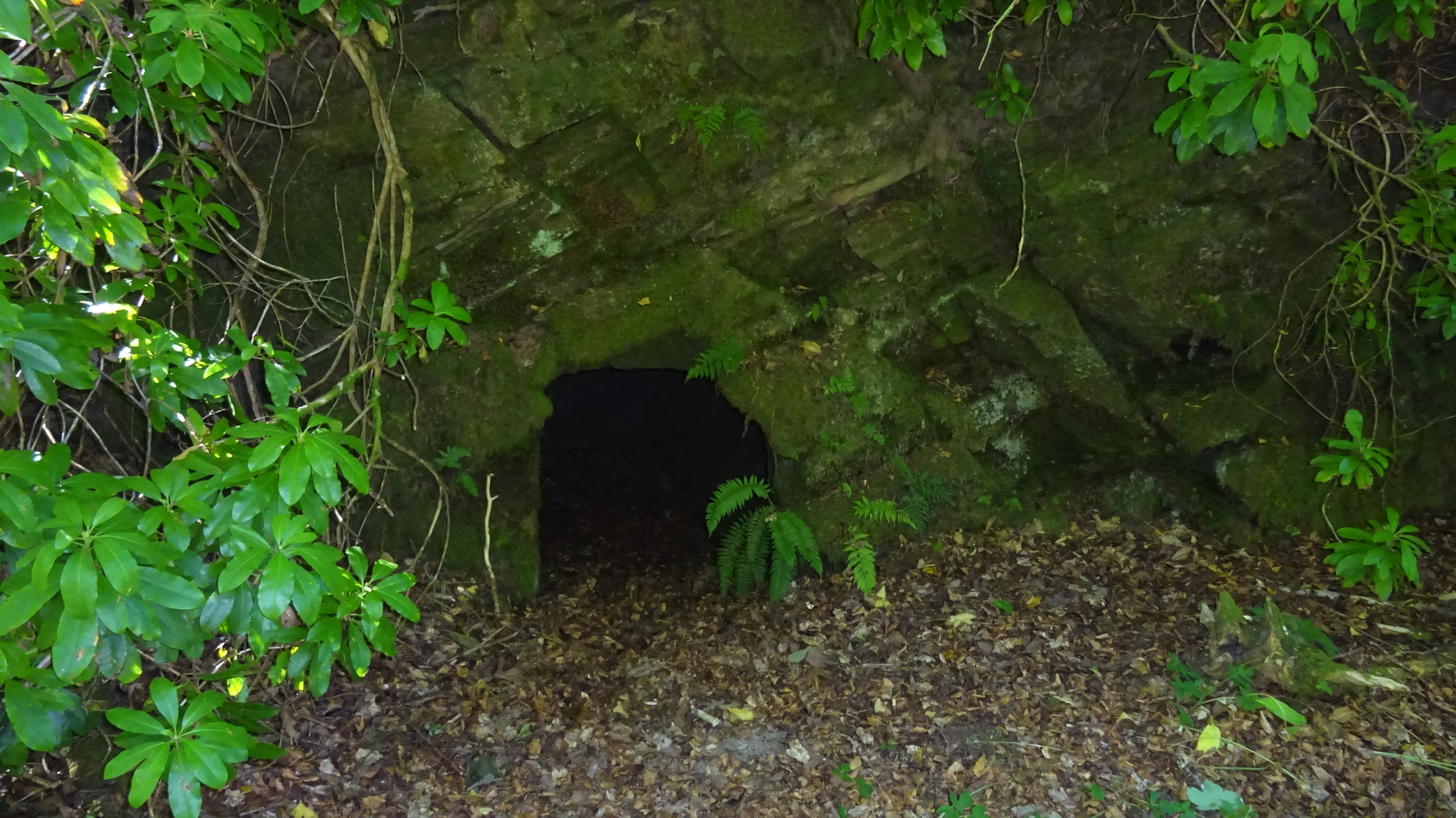
The entrance to the old game larder.

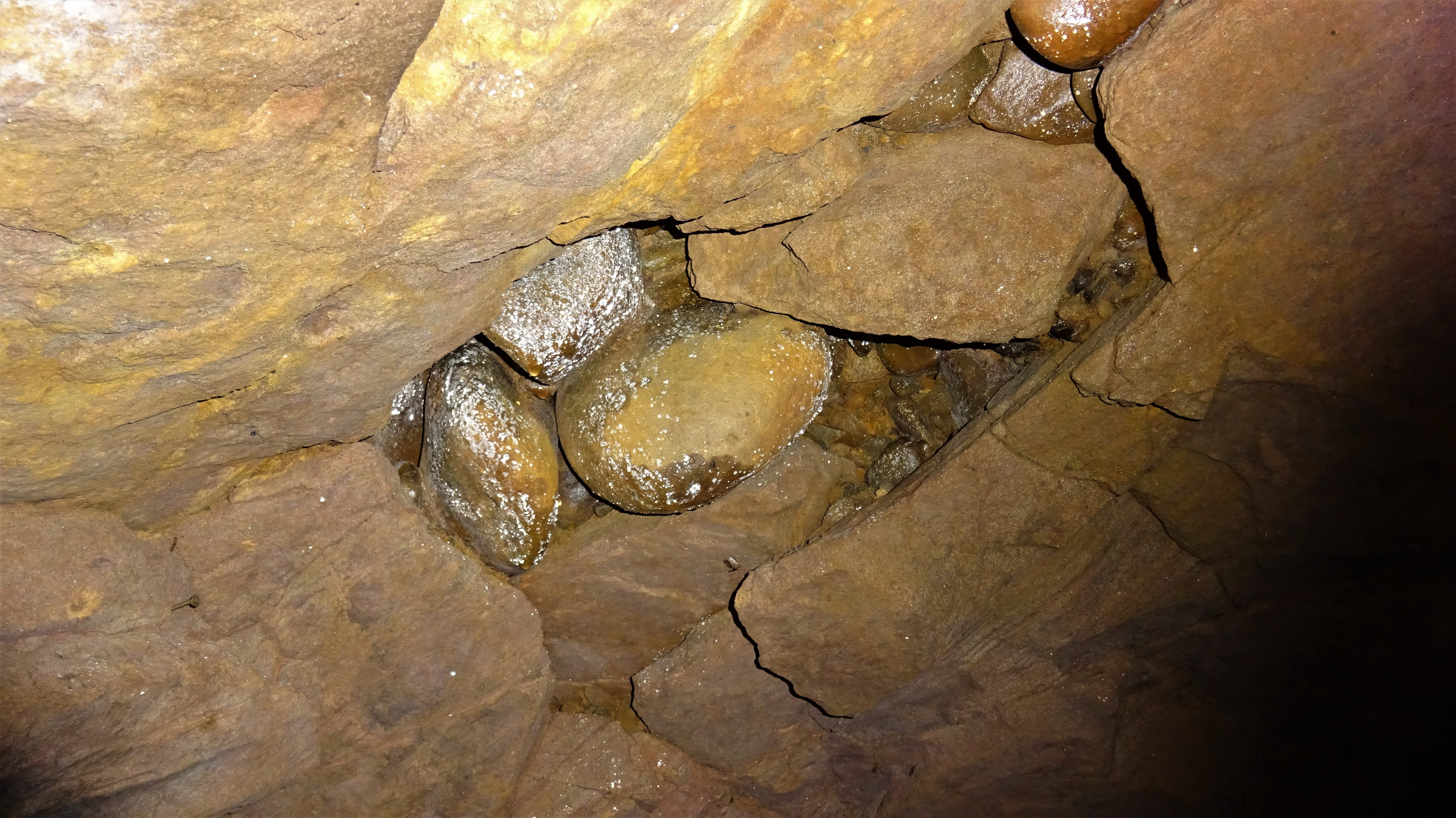
A repaired collapse in the game larder roof.

A path from the lodge once led down to an artificial cave cut into soft red sandstone next to the Crawick Water and close to the Soldier's Pool. Locally known as the Witches' Cave, it lay below the old Holm Hunting Lodge. It stands beside a bend in the Crawick Water and the river bank here is protected by a stone wall, now partly collapsed. A stone path and steps run dow to this area from the Holm Walks above. The cave has some features typical of an ice house such as double doors, its location in woodland and the insulation afforded by soft red sandstone. The cave though lacks a deep pit and its role as a game larder is indicated by several large iron nails hammered into the soft red sandstone to hang the game birds, rabbits, deer, etc. until they were matured for cooking. The marks used by the stonemason's tools to create the single chamber can still be clearly seen, especially near the entrance.

== The Crawick Glen ==
The deeply cut wooded glen with deep pools and waterfalls is formed from blue whinstone rocks with red sandstone overlying in places. The Crawick Water itself is formed from the Wanlock and Spango Waters and has a confluence with the River Nith.

=== The Holms Walks ===
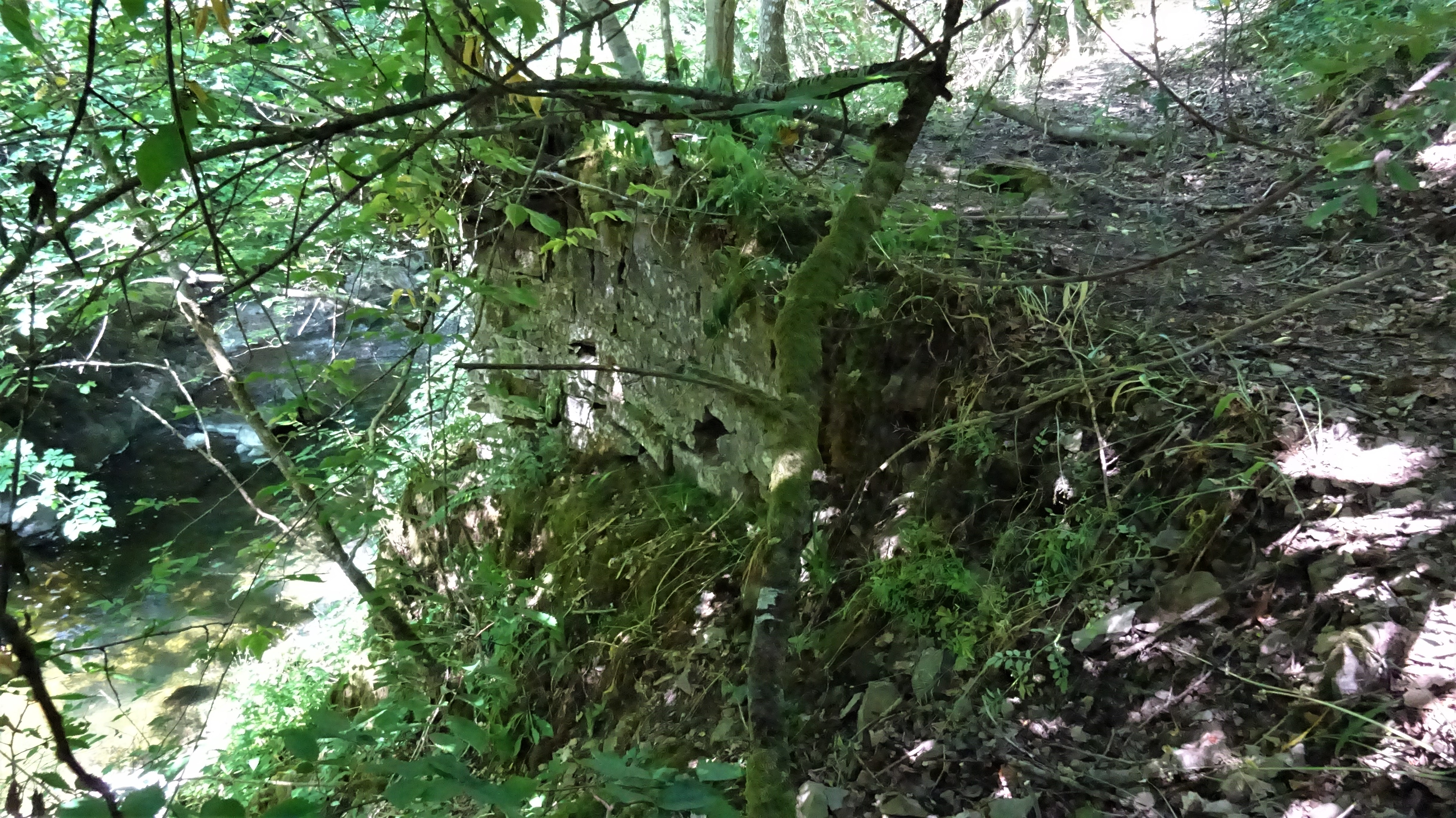
Abutment of the old upper bridge.

The Duke of Buccleuch created a network of pedestrian paths throughout the wooded glen with bridges at the top and bottom and seating. The path upstream beyond the bridge ended at a bench located at a viewpoint. One of the bridges has collapsed and the other has been replaced. Public access was permitted and most remain in use. The duke also carried out fairly extensive plantings, creating the Moor Plantation. The area is still a popular haunt for locals and the main paths are maintained by volunteers. The Crawick Multiverse lies nearby.

=== The Witches of the Crawick Glen ===
==== Witches' Linn ====
It is "So called from its being the place where the Witches who formerly inhabited the Village of Crawick, are said to have wrought their cantrips and to have practised their witcheries. It is a darkly shaded Glen through which the Conrig burn flows near to its junction with the Crawick Water." A number of local tales of the witches actions have been recorded.

==== Witches' Craig ====
This is a prominent rock close to the confluence of the Conrig burn with the Crawick water near Sarah's Trough. Oral legend has it that this was a favourite meeting place of the fairies or witches, who inhabited the adjoining Witches Linn.

=== Sir William Douglas ===
Legend has it that Sir William Douglas of Douglasdale hid his soldiers in the Crawick Glen whilst planning the ultimately successful capture of Sanquhar Castle, on behalf of William Wallace, from the English and reconnoitering the area.

=== The Soldier's Pool ===
The Soldier's or Sodger's Pool lies close to the ruins of Holm House and owes its name to the 60 to 70 French, Italian, German, Polish, etc. Napoleonic prisoners of war who were billeted in the Sanquhar and Crawick area between 1812 and 1815. From the army and navy, many were officers, some even with servants, who were under a "Parole of Honour" and as such were given considerable freedom to roam at will, being limited to up to 3 miles from the burgh boundary. The pool has a small beach and was a favourite spot for the prisoners.

=== Napoleonic Prisoners' Graffiti ===
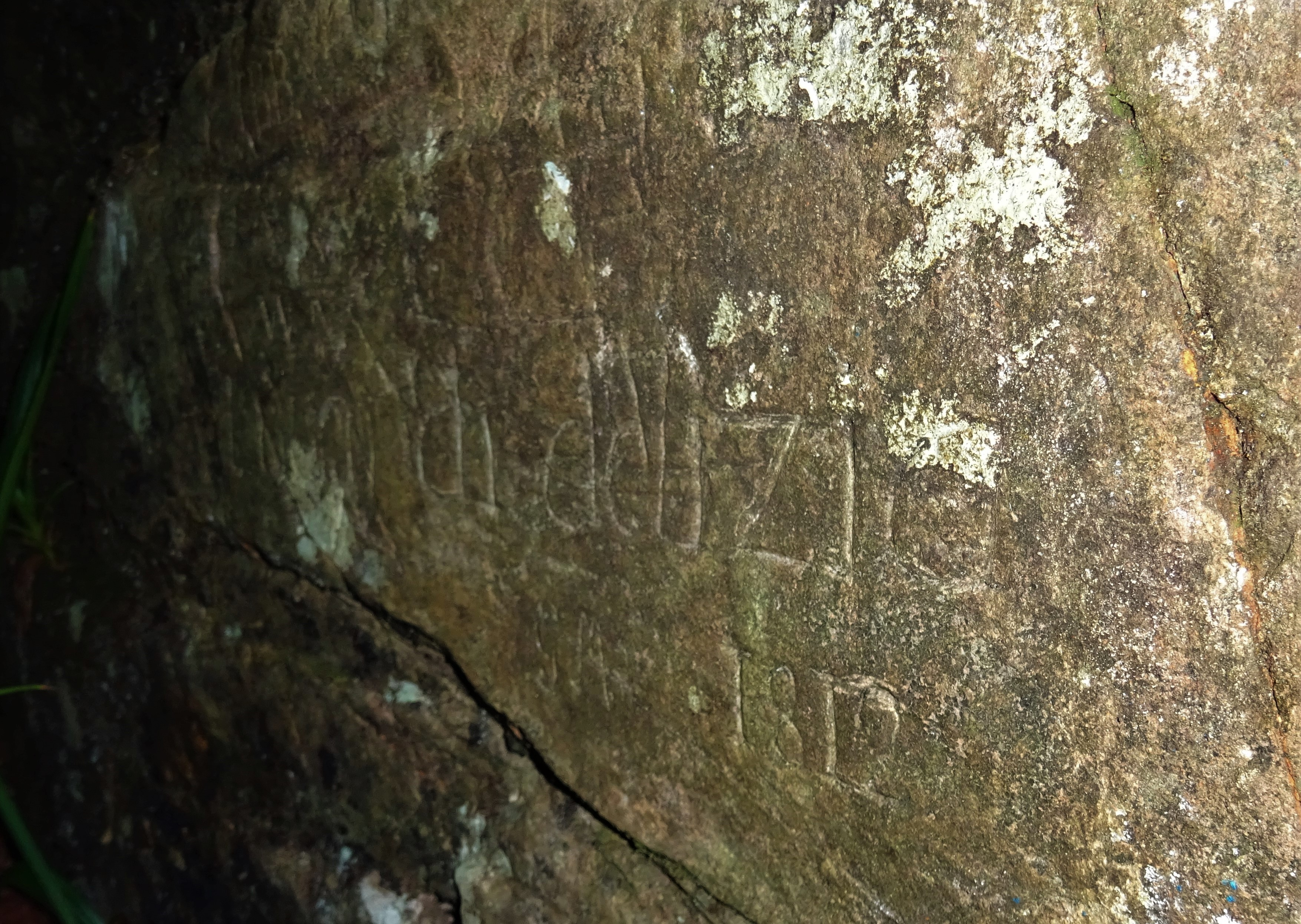
Napoleonic soldier's graffiti.

As stated, between 1812 and 1815 seventy or so Napoleonic War army and navy officers were billeted in Sanquhar Burgh. These prisoners had a great deal of freedom and often visited the Crawick Water to swim and walk in the woods. Overlooking the glen near Sarah's Trough is a large and flat faced vertical rock that is covered in graffiti left by the prisoners and other visitors. Much of it is now hard to read, although the words 'Luogo di Delizia' are still discernable, being in the Italian language and meaning 'delightful place'. The dates 1812 and 1814 are visible, a possible coat of arms, some well-carved initials and the French word 'Souvenir' that can mean 'memory, remembrance, recollection, keepsake or memento'.

Several of the pictorial carvings, as well as the numerous initials, may well have been added later. Some of the Holm Walks paths in the Crawick Glen are out of use and hazardous; the upper bridge itself has collapsed. The prisoners' graffiti 'panel' has become hard to reach and the downstream riverside approach is dangerous. A few of the beech trees have initials carved on them that may be from Napoleonic times.

=== Covenanters ===
A cave (NS783114), locally known as the 'Snake's Cave' is located just off the course of the Holm Walks path running upstream near the Sarah's Trough pool. This has been associated with Covenanters hiding from the King's troops.

=== Sarah's Trough ===
A deep pool in the Crawick Water below the Witches' Crag is so called in memory of a girl named Sarah who was drowned there long ago.

=== Etymology ===
The name Crawick derives from 'Carwick' or 'Carraig', meaning rocky.

== Micro-history ==
In British usage 'Crawick' is technically a hamlet rather than a village as it has always lacked a formal dedicated church of its own.

== See also ==
- Crawick
