= Cosmic House =

Historic building in Holland Park, London, England

Coordinates: 51°30′31″N 0°12′26″W

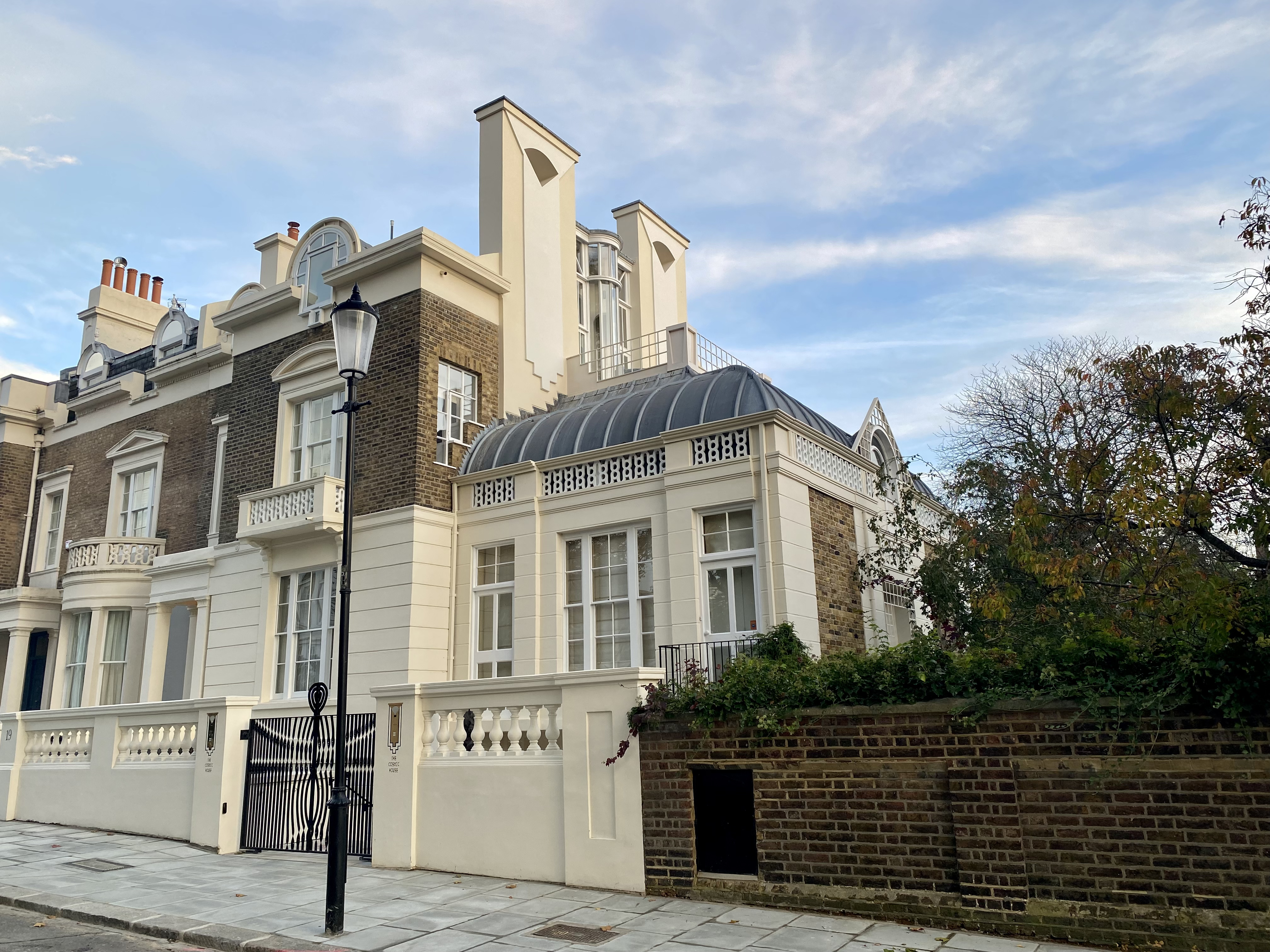
The Cosmic House in October 2021

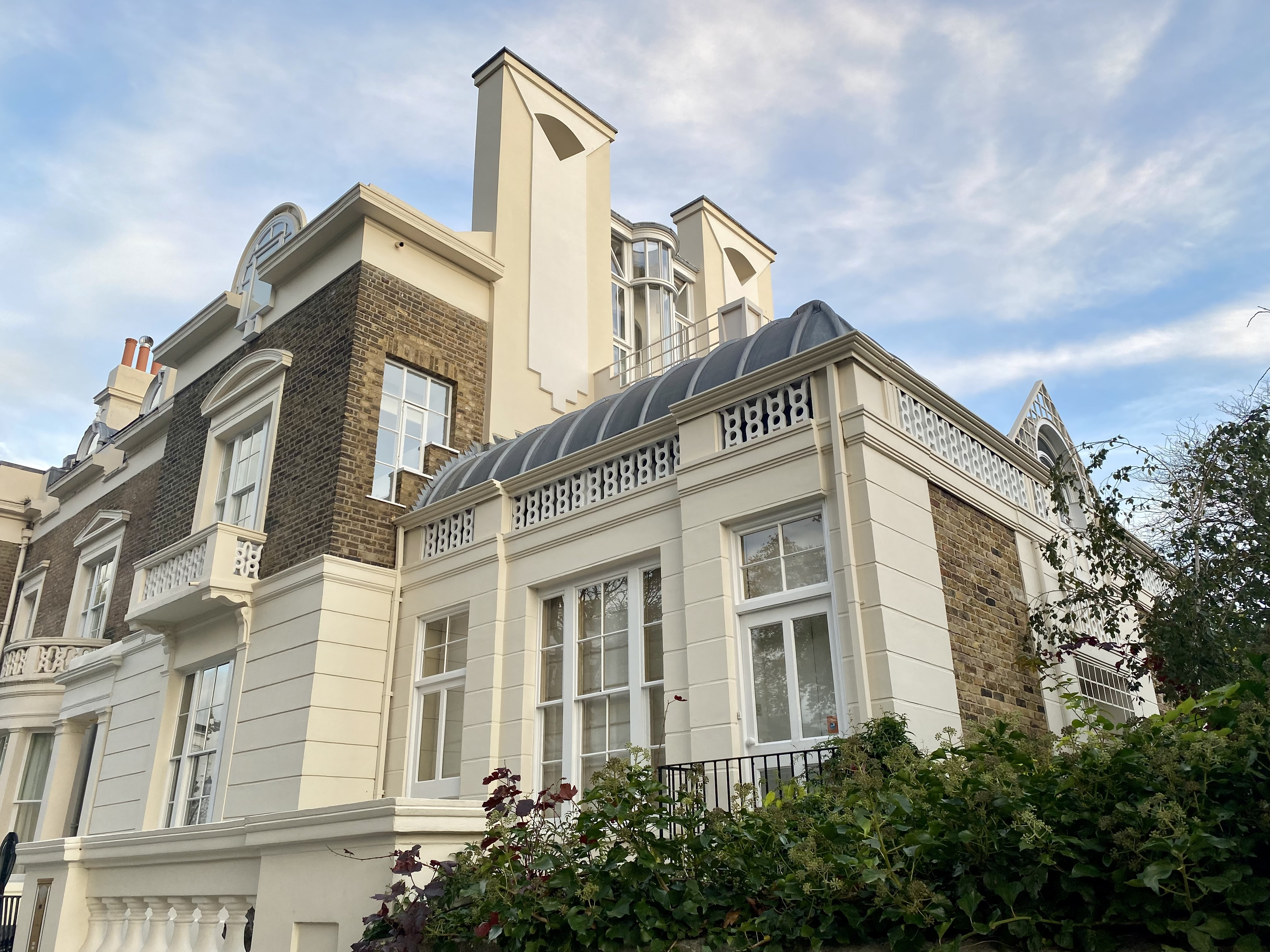

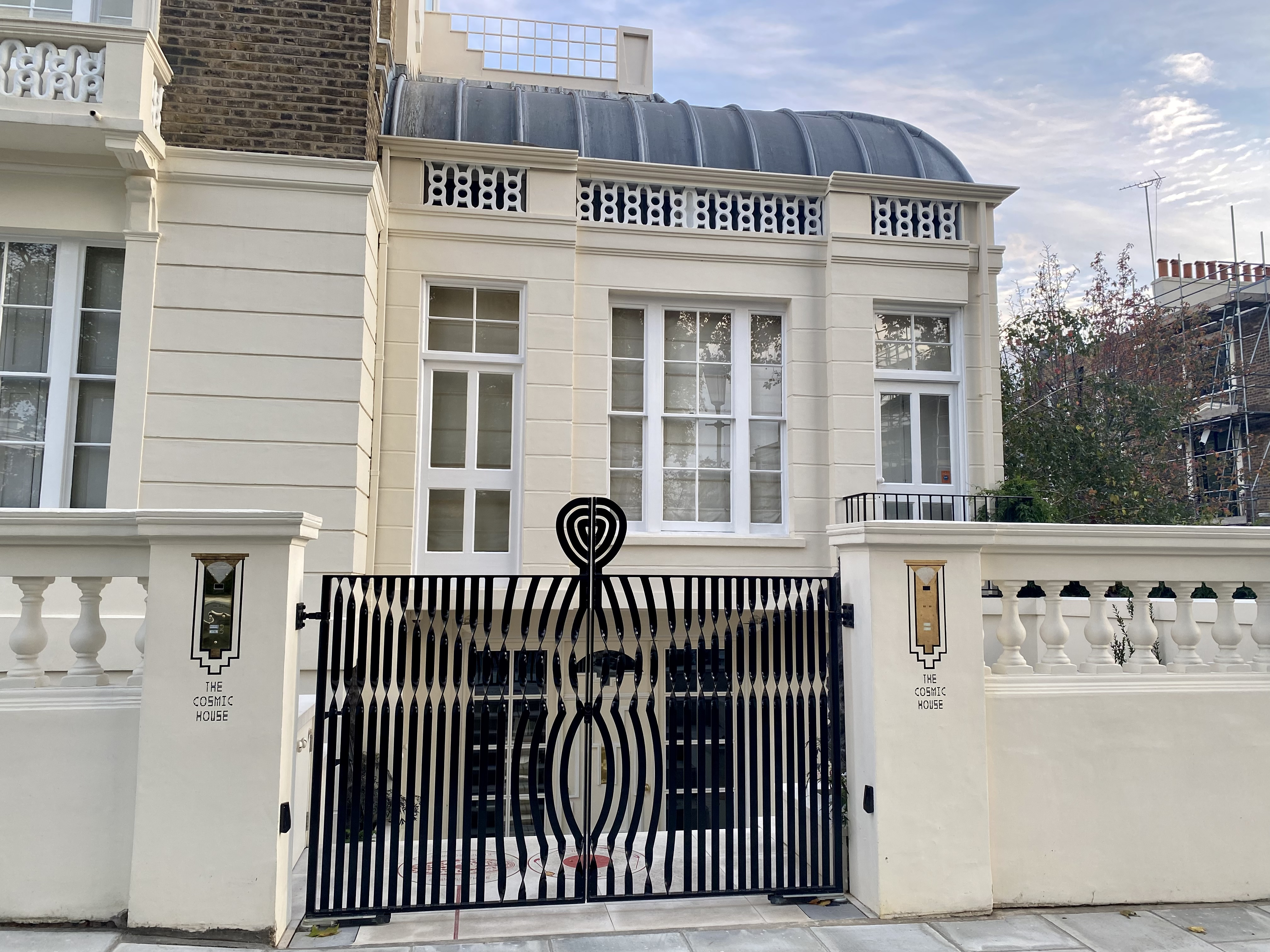
The entrance gates of The Cosmic House

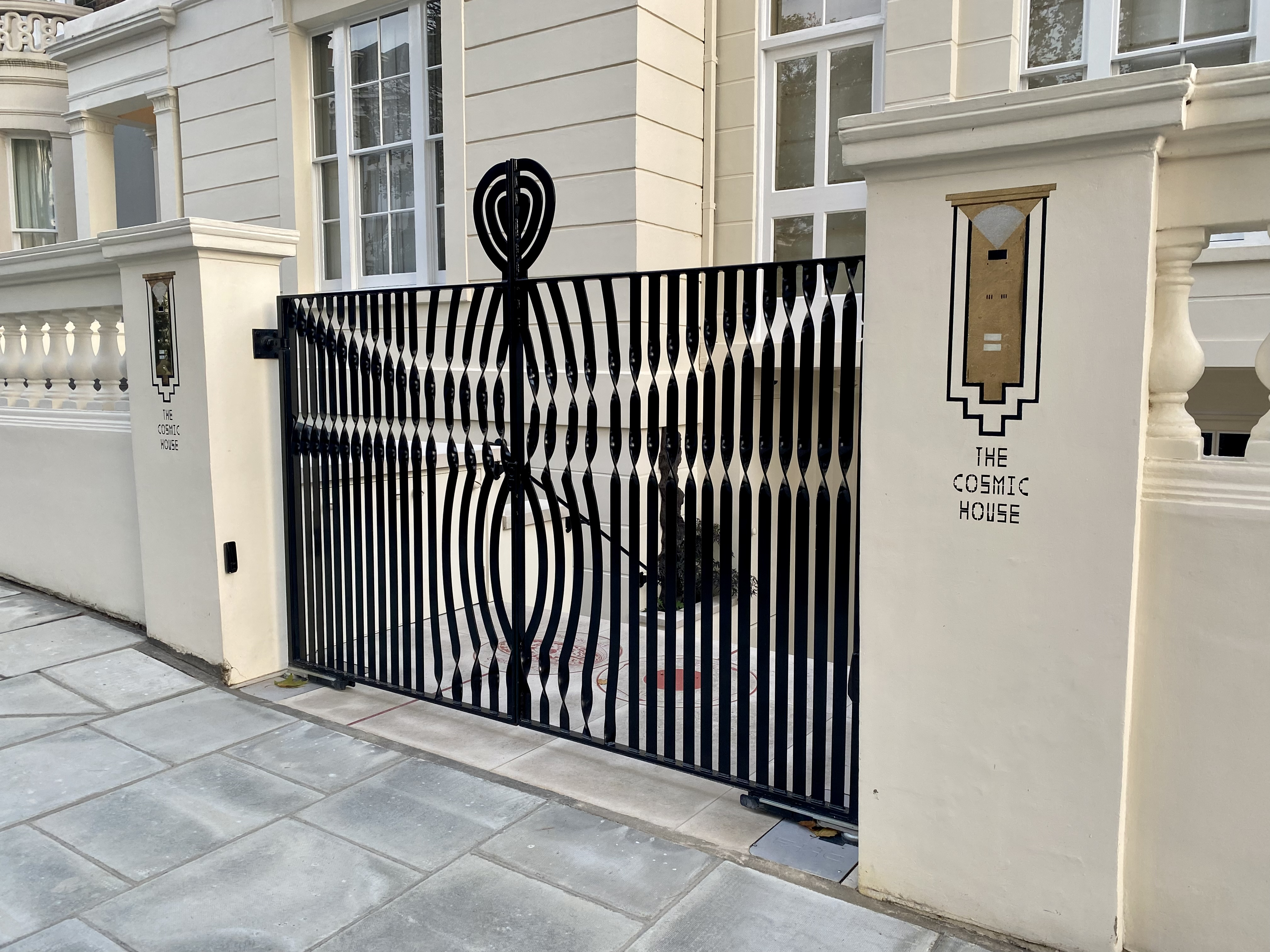

The Cosmic House (formerly known as the Thematic House) is a house at 19 Lansdowne Walk in Holland Park, Kensington, London. It has been listed Grade I on the National Heritage List for England since May 2018.

== Building and design ==
Cosmic House was designed by Charles Jencks and Maggie Keswick Jencks as their family home, in collaboration with other postmodern architects including Terry Farrell and Michael Graves. The sculptors Celia Scott and Eduardo Paolozzi also participated in its development. The architect Rem Koolhaas made a design for the Spring Room that was rejected by Jencks as "not symbolic enough."

The existing 1840s end-of-terrace villa was initially purchased by Jencks and his wife Maggie Keswick in May 1978, and the transformation of the main structure was completed in 1983. The stucco-fronted building houses such interior features as pedimented bookshelves, a sundial window seat, and an upside-down classical dome serving as a jacuzzi. The main Solar Stair is complemented by a semi-circular 'Moonwell', which channels natural light over a darker area. The house encapsulates Jencks's theories, before he died, Jencks made plans for it to be converted into an archive museum. It opened to the public from 24 September 2021, as "The Cosmic House".
