= The Story of Post-Modernism =

2011 book by Charles Jencks

The Story of Post-Modernism: Five Decades of the Ironic, Iconic and Critical in Architecture
- First image
- Language: English
- Subject: Theory and History of Art & Architecture
- Publisher: John Wiley & Sons
- Publication date: 2011
- Publication place: United States
- Media type: Print, e-book
- ISBN: 978-0470688953

The Story of Post-Modernism: Five Decades of the Ironic, Iconic and Critical in Architecture, published in 2011, was the last book by Charles Jencks. Jencks discusses the history of Post-modernism, especially in the fields of art and architecture during the last five decades (since 1960). Jencks argues that since the beginning of the millennium, post-modernism has experienced a deep rebirth which should be studied.

The Story of Post-Modernism has divided its narration into seven parts which are both in order of time and lap-jointed. It illustrate the way post-modern movement has gone up and down passing through different train of thoughts. Using many pictures and diagrams, Jencks in each chapter focuses on the main works of a given period and offers a deep analysis of them.

Jencks in the book explains on why he is using the term Post-Modernism and not postmodernism as this:

As an unfinished movement of five decades, Post-Modernism is still contentious, and critics disagree over its meaning. The different spellings reflect this, including the streamlined version of a single word, Postmodernism. Yet, since critics agree that the designation refers to the era of pluralism after Modernism, I prefer the hyphenated version a spelling that underscores its double-coding. It is of course tiresome to reread the same phrase again and again, so I will refer to pm, lower case, when it is a general social phenomenon, PM when it is the artistic or cultural movement, and PoMo when it is the mass-cultural genre, or even kitsch. Need it be said that the era of post-modernity only refers to a minority of culture where Modernism, modernisation and modernity are still the desired states of much of the globe?

- Post-Modernism or PM = The artistic or cultural movement
- PoMo = the mass cultural genre
- pm = the general social phenomenon

== See also ==
- Postmodernism
- Architectural theory
- Postmodern architecture
- Charles Jencks
- Theories and Manifestoes of Contemporary Architecture
