= Theories and Manifestoes of Contemporary Architecture =

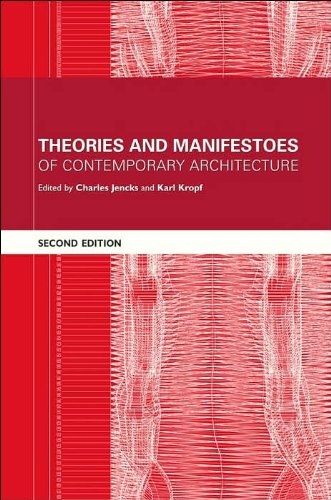
- Language: English
- Subject: Theory and History of Architecture
- Publisher: Wily
- Publication date: 1997
- Publication place: United Kingdom

Theories and Manifestoes of Contemporary Architecture is a book by historian and architectural theorist Charles Jencks who is well known for his contribution in post-modernism discourse. Jencks as the first architectural historian who claimed for the death of modernism, here shows how post-modern architecture have developed its fundamental theories.

Theories and Manifestoes of Contemporary Architecture as an anthology of architectural theories consists of over 120 major theories and manifestoes that have been proposed since 1950's. The book was originally published in 1997, and then the second edition of it in 2006 by : Wiley-Academy. Dividing into six sections of Post-Modern, Post-Modern Ecology, Traditional, Late Modern, New Modern, Complexity and Chaos theory, it has covered all the main issues have been discussed the years 1955–2005 in architectural theory.

== See also ==
- Architectural theory
- Postmodern architecture
- Modern architecture
- The Story of Post-Modernism
