= Crawick Multiverse =

Land art project by Charles Jencks near Sanquhar, Scotland

Coordinates: 55.382°N 3.9323°W

Designations

Inventory of Gardens and Designed Landscapes in Scotland
- Official name: Crawick Multiverse
- Designated: 28 March 2024
- Reference no.: GDL00413

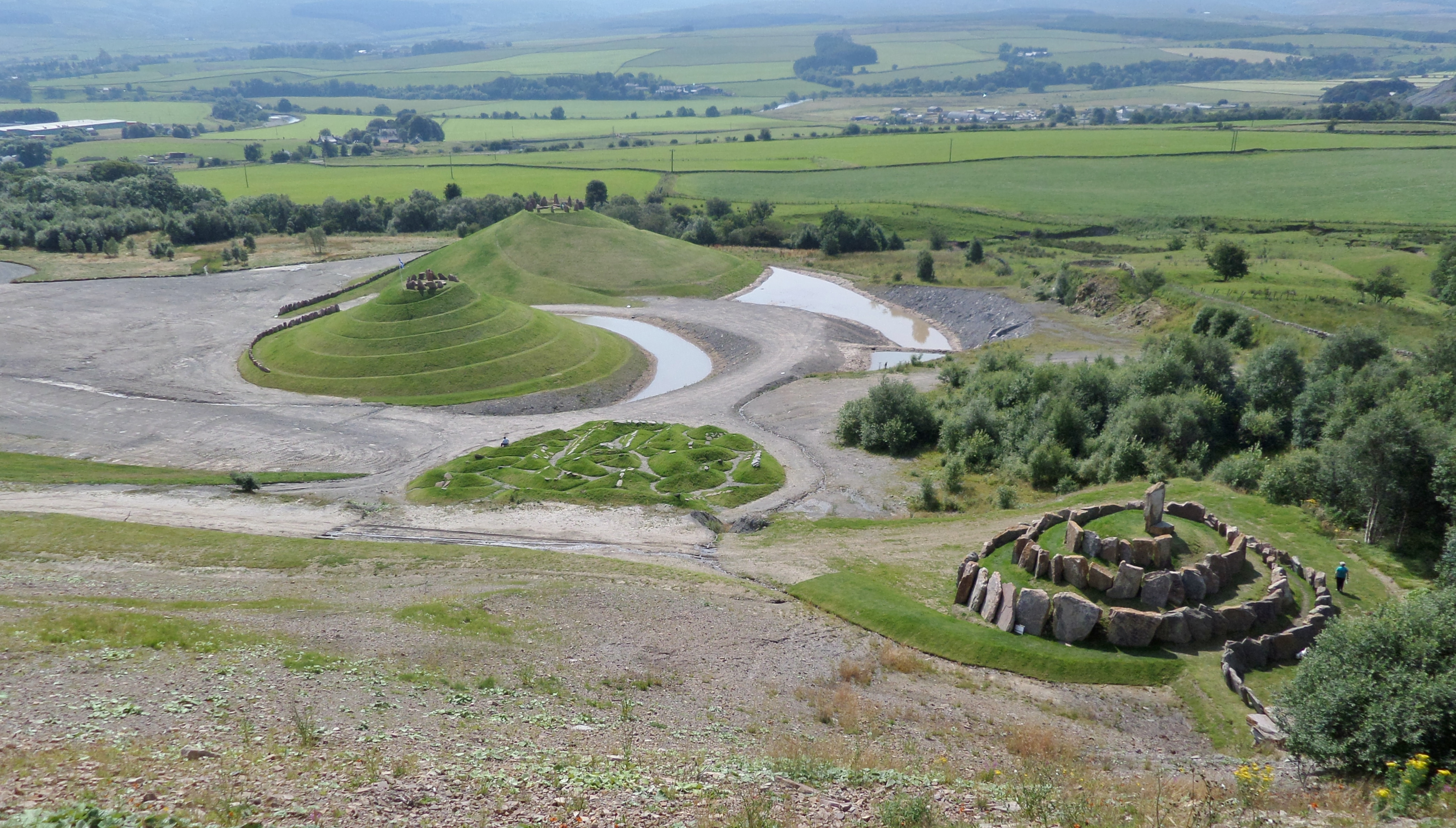
Landforms: Multiverse (foreground); Supercluster (centre); Milky Way and Andromeda Galaxy Mounds (behind).

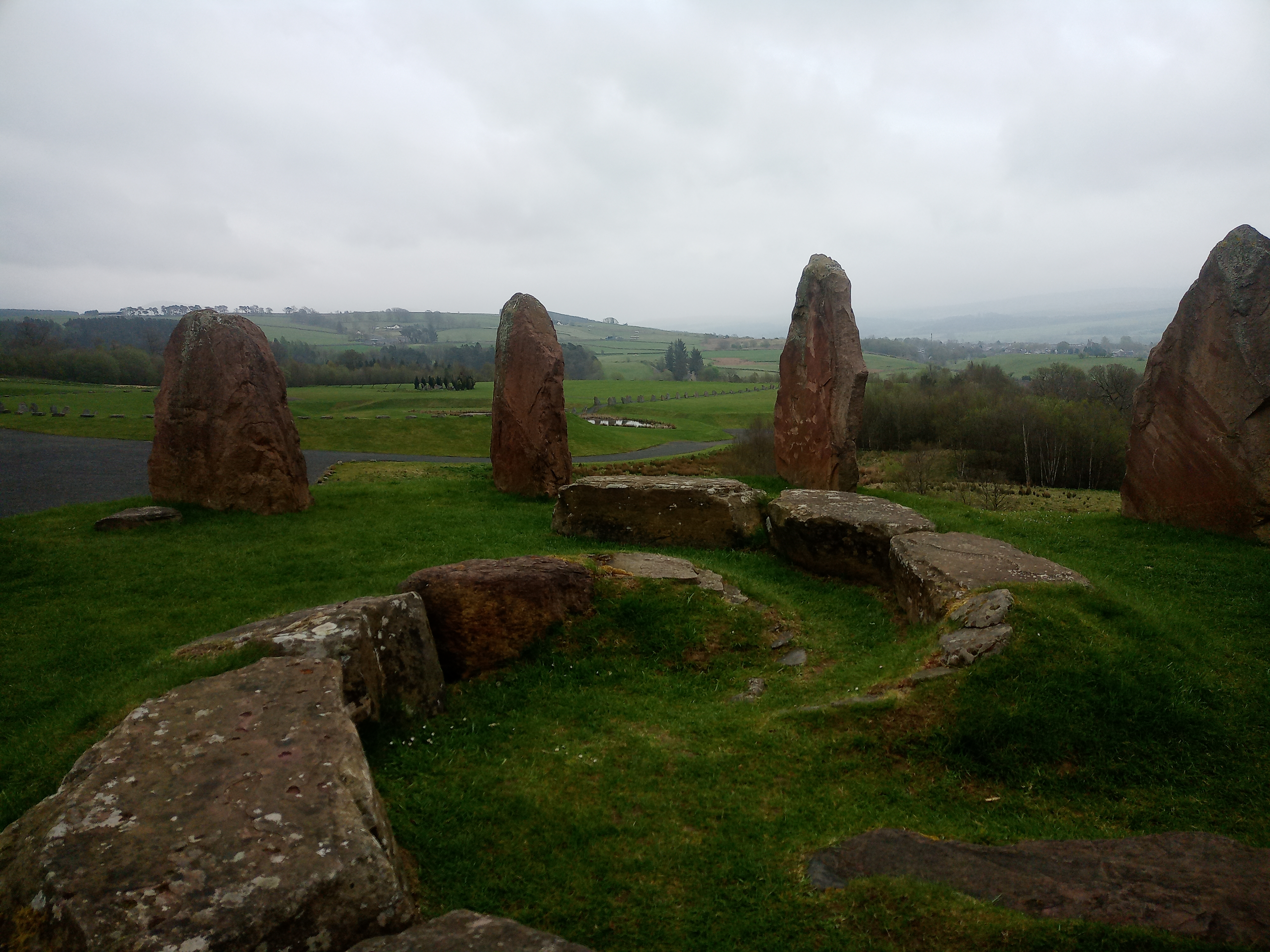
A landform at the Crawick Multiverse

Crawick Multiverse is a land art project by the landscape architect and designer Charles Jencks near Sanquhar, Dumfries and Galloway. The project began in 2005 when Jencks was invited to re-imagine an abandoned mine, and it opened to the public on 21 June 2015. The project is located on the site of a former open cast coal mine and covers approximately 55 acres, making it the largest of Jencks's works in Britain. Nine 'landforms' make up the Crawick Multiverse.

Like some of Jencks's other work, including the nearby Garden of Cosmic Speculation, this project represent ideas from modern cosmology, specifically the theory that our universe is one of many. Unlike the Garden of Cosmic Speculation, the Crawick Multiverse landforms use stone, in the style of the megalithic monuments. These include the 'North-South Line', a 400 meter long stone avenue flanked by over 300 boulders, and two stone circles on top of mounds representing the Milky Way and Andromeda galaxies. In total, over 2000 boulders have been used in the project. Jencks has described it as "A cosmic landscape worthy of the ancients."

== See also ==
- Holm House and the Crawick Glen
