= Laura Lee (executive) =

South African-born Scottish Chief Executive of Maggie's

Dame Laura Lee DBE
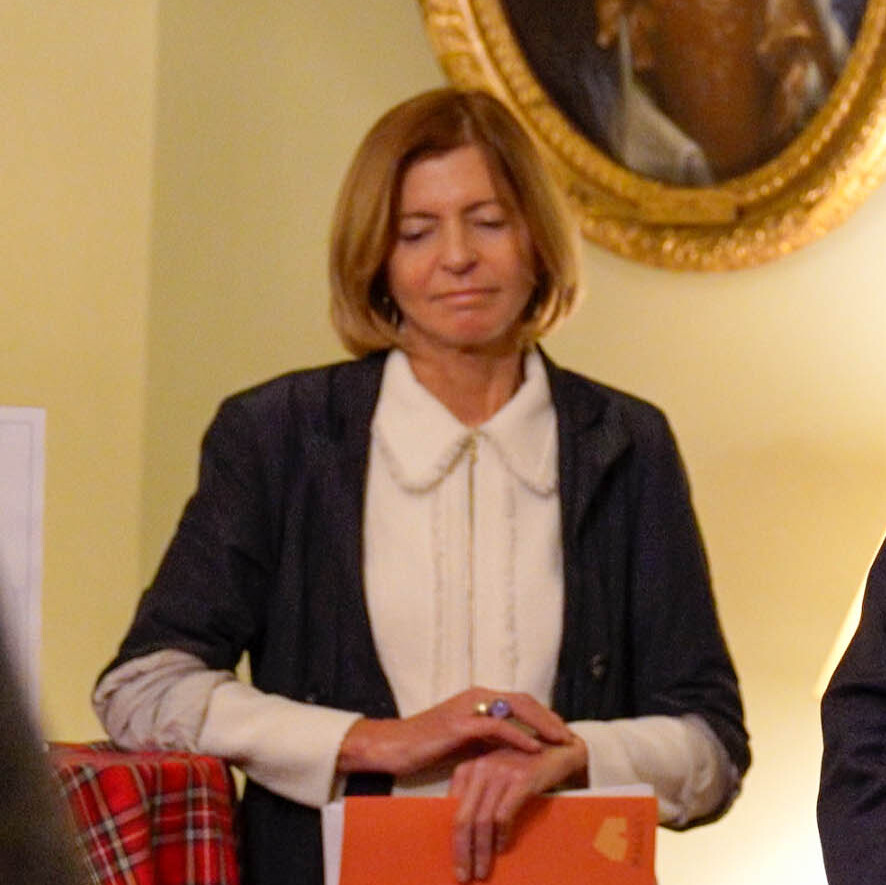
- Born: Laura Elizabeth Lee; 15 October 1966 (aged 59); South Africa
- Occupations: nurse, charity leader
- Employer(s): NHS, Maggie's
- Known for: driving force of leading charity

Laura Elizabeth Lee DBE (born 15 October 1966) is a British Chief Executive of Maggie's. This is a Cancer Caring Centres Trust which she has led since 1996 after being inspired by Maggie Keswick Jencks. She was made a Dame in the New Years Honours list in 2019.

== Life ==
Lee was born in South Africa. When she was seventeen she left home in Peterhead as she began a career in nursing. She trained as a nurse in Edinburgh where she discovered that she liked the long-term caring that was given to cancer patients.

When she was 25 Lee took the bold step of leaving the NHS as one of her patients, Maggie Jencks, had convinced her that inspiring places should be built where people could have their treatment for cancer. Lee had been Maggie's oncology nurse and during her eighteen months of treatment they became friends. Maggie had studied at the Architecture Association and many of the country's leading architects were her friends.

On Maggie's last day she looked at the plans of an old stable block that would be the basis of a corridor-less design by Richard Murphy. That first one was built in Edinburgh, the second in Glasgow and the third in Dundee. The sixth one was in Fulham, London, and was a contender in the 2009 Stirling architecture prize. It was designed by Richard Rogers' firm. In 2008, the president of the charity became future Queen Camilla.

== Honours ==
In 2019, Laura Lee was made a Dame Commander of the Order of the British Empire in the New Years Honours list.

In 2020, Lee was awarded the Pride of Scotland by Queen Camilla in recognition of her achievement.

In 2026, Lee was part of the 30th celebration event led by First Minister John Swinney at Bute House. On 4 February 2026 the British government announced their plans for cancer at Maggie's at the Royal Free Hospital. Lee was there to greet him and welcome Health Secretary Wes Streeting's plans.
