= Maggie Keswick Jencks =

Scottish writer, artist and garden designer

Maggie Keswick Jencks DBE
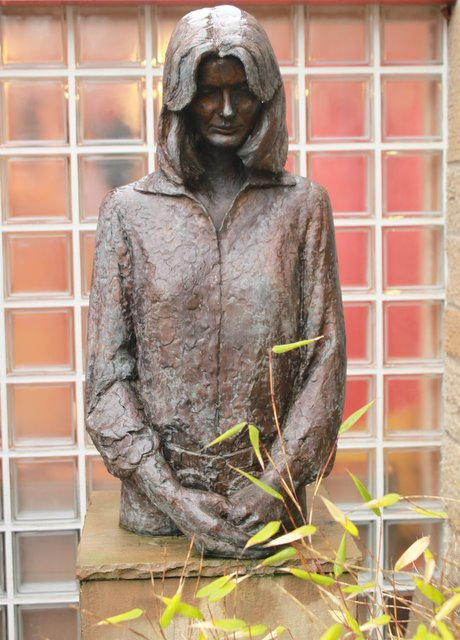
- Statue of Maggie Jencks at Maggie's Centre in Edinburgh
- Born: Maggie Keswick; October 10, 1941; Cowhill Tower, Holywood, Dumfriesshire, Scotland
- Died: July 8, 1995 (aged 53); London, England
- Occupations: Writer; Artist; Garden designer
- Years active: 1978–1995
- Spouse: Charles Jencks
- Father: Sir John Keswick

Margaret Keswick Jencks (10 October 1941 – 8 July 1995) was a Scottish writer, artist and garden designer who co-founded Maggie's Centres with her husband Charles Jencks.

== Early life ==
Margaret Keswick was born at Cowhill Tower near Holywood in the county of Dumfriesshire in Scotland the only child of Sir John Keswick and (Celia) Clare Mary Alice (1905-1998), daughter of the tenor Gervase Elwes, and a cousin of the actor Cary Elwes, the Elwes family being landed gentry of Roxby, Lincolnshire. Maggie's father was taipan of Jardine Matheson, the influential Scottish–Chinese trading company. The family spent time in Hong Kong and Shanghai as well as the UK. Keswick was educated in England and read English at Lady Margaret Hall, Oxford. After working in fashion, she studied at the Architectural Association in London.

== Garden design and collaborations ==
One of Maggie Jencks's main interests was in garden design. In 1978 she published The Chinese Garden: History, Art and Architecture. She collaborated with her husband on the design of the gardens at Portrack, their family home near Dumfries, Scotland, and on extensive alterations to the house's interior.

Another major collaboration was couple's famous house in Notting Hill, London - open to the public from 2021 as the Cosmic House - designed with the architect Terry Farrell. Her other garden designs included one inspired by the pastoral poems of John Milton for the Jencks' house in California; a collaboration with the American architect Frank Gehry on the Lewis House at Cleveland, Ohio, where fibre-optics and running water created a highly original landscape; and a garden for the film director Roger Corman.

== Career and legacy ==
In 1978, she married Charles Jencks, writer and landscape artist. She was his second wife. Together they founded the first Maggie's Centres in Edinburgh, which opened in 1996.

She died of cancer in 1995 after being cared for by cancer nurse Laura Lee. Laura left the NHS to be "the driving force" as CEO of the Maggie's Centres. Lee was made a Dame for her work.

A bust of Jencks is on display in the Hall of Heroes of the National Wallace Monument in Stirling.

== Publications ==
- Keswick, Maggie; Jencks, Charles; Hardie, Alison (1978). The Chinese Garden: History, Art and Architecture. Cambridge, MA: Harvard University Press. ISBN 978-0-674-01086-4. OCLC 223412044.
