= Maggie's =

Drop-in centres for those affected by cancer

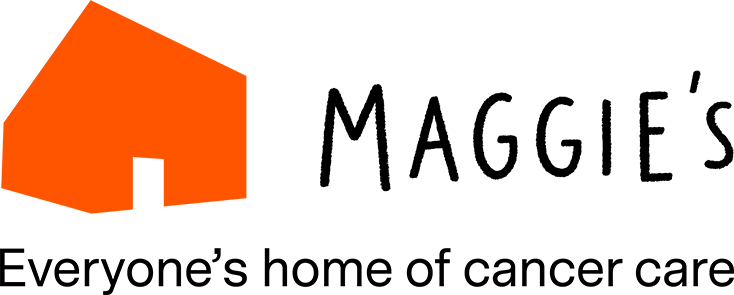
- Founded: 1995; 31 years ago
- Founder: Maggie Keswick Jencks; Charles Jencks
- Type: Charitable organisation
- Registration no.: SC024414
- Purpose: Cancer care
- Region served: United Kingdom; Hong Kong; Tokyo; Barcelona; Netherlands
- Key people: Queen Camilla (President); Dame Laura Lee (Chief Executive)
- Website: maggies.org

Maggie's centres are a network of drop-in centres across the United Kingdom and abroad that aim to help anyone who has been affected by cancer. They are intended as welcoming and caring environments that provide support, information and practical advice to people dealing with a cancer diagnosis. They also offer wellbeing sessions and workshops to complement conventional cancer therapy.

The Maggie's centres in the United Kingdom are located near, but are detached from, existing NHS hospitals.

== History ==
Maggie's was founded by and named after the late Maggie Keswick Jencks. In 1994, she wrote a text called "A View From the Frontline" about her diagnosis and treatment, an experience which shaped the centres. She died of cancer in 1995. Like her husband, architectural writer and critic Charles Jencks, she believed in the ability of buildings to uplift people. From its foundation the leader of the organisation has been Laura Lee.

In 2016, Maggie's merged with Cancerkin, a charity in the United Kingdom which offers support to breast cancer patients. Cancerkin is based at the Royal Free Hospital in North London and was founded in 1987.

The Scottish registered charity (registration number SC024414) that promotes, builds and runs the centres is formally named the Maggie Keswick Jencks Cancer Caring Trust, but refers to itself simply as Maggie's.

The buildings that house the centres have been designed by leading architects, including Frank Gehry, Zaha Hadid and Richard Rogers. Christian Voice has been criticised for its role in causing Maggie's centres to decline a four-figure donation from the proceeds of a special performance of Jerry Springer: The Opera. The charity had been due to receive £10 per ticket for an afternoon gala in 2005 but declined the donation after Christian Voice had threatened to picket their centres.

Patrons of the charity include Frank Gehry, Janet Ellis, Norman Foster, Kirsty Wark, and Sarah Brown, wife of former British prime minister Gordon Brown. The charity's chief executive is Dame Laura Lee, who was founder Maggie's cancer nurse. The president of the charity is Queen Camilla.

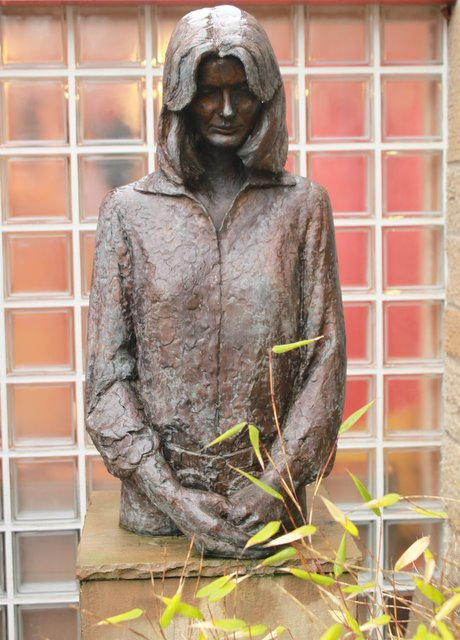
Statue of Maggie Jencks at Maggie's Centre in Edinburgh

== Locations ==
=== Scotland ===
==== Edinburgh ====
The first Maggie's centre opened in Edinburgh in 1996, and is located within the Western General Hospital on Crewe Road. The centre is housed in a converted stable block. The conversion, designed by Richard Murphy, was nominated for the 1997 Stirling Prize. The centre was extended, again by Murphy, in 1999.

==== Glasgow ====
Glasgow's first Maggie's centre opened in 2002 and was located at the Western Infirmary on Dumbarton Road, near the Kelvingrove Museum. The centre was housed in a former gatehouse lodge of the University of Glasgow, renovated and altered by Page\Park Architects. Charles Jencks designed the landscaping around the site, and contributed a DNA sculpture for the garden. In 2011, a new facility opened at Gartnavel, designed by OMA and led by Dutch architect Rem Koolhaas and Ellen van Loon.

==== Dundee ====
Frank Gehry's first building in the United Kingdom was the Maggie's centre at Dundee. The centre opened in September 2003 at Ninewells Hospital. Gehry's design was named "Building of the Year" by the Royal Fine Art Commission for Scotland, and was also nominated for the 2004 RIAS Andrew Doolan Award for Architecture.

==== Highlands ====
The Maggie's centre in Inverness, Highland, is at Raigmore Hospital, and was designed by David Page of Page\Park Architects. Landscape design and sculptures were again the work of Charles Jencks. The building opened in 2005, and won the 2006 RIAS Andrew Doolan Award for Architecture.

==== Fife ====
The Maggie's centre in Kirkcaldy, Fife, opened in November 2006 at the Victoria Hospital. The building was designed by Zaha Hadid, and is her first built work in the UK. In the building there is emphasis placed on the transition between the natural and the man-made, and on the period between the hospital and home; the transition after having undergone treatment. There was an emphasis on clear and translucent glass, with powerfully sculptural cantilevers. The entrance facade is almost entirely made from glass. On the north side, the roof extension protects the entrance, while to the south, it provides shade. This can be seen as a fusion between form and function. Much thought has gone into the layout of the building, with the kitchen as the centre of the building and an informal atmosphere.

==== Aberdeen ====
Maggie's Aberdeen was designed by Norwegian architects Snøhetta at Aberdeen Royal Infirmary, Aberdeen and opened in 2013.

==== Lanarkshire ====
Maggie's Lanarkshire opened in 2014 at Monklands Hospital, Airdrie and was designed by Reiach and Hall Architects of Edinburgh.

==== Forth Valley ====
Maggie's Forth Valley was designed by London-based architects Garbers & James and opened in 2017. The centre borders Larbert Loch, by Forth Valley Royal Hospital.

==== Dumfries ====
In August 2025 it was announced that the building of a new Maggie's had been green-lit, to be located in the grounds of Dumfries and Galloway Royal Infirmary.

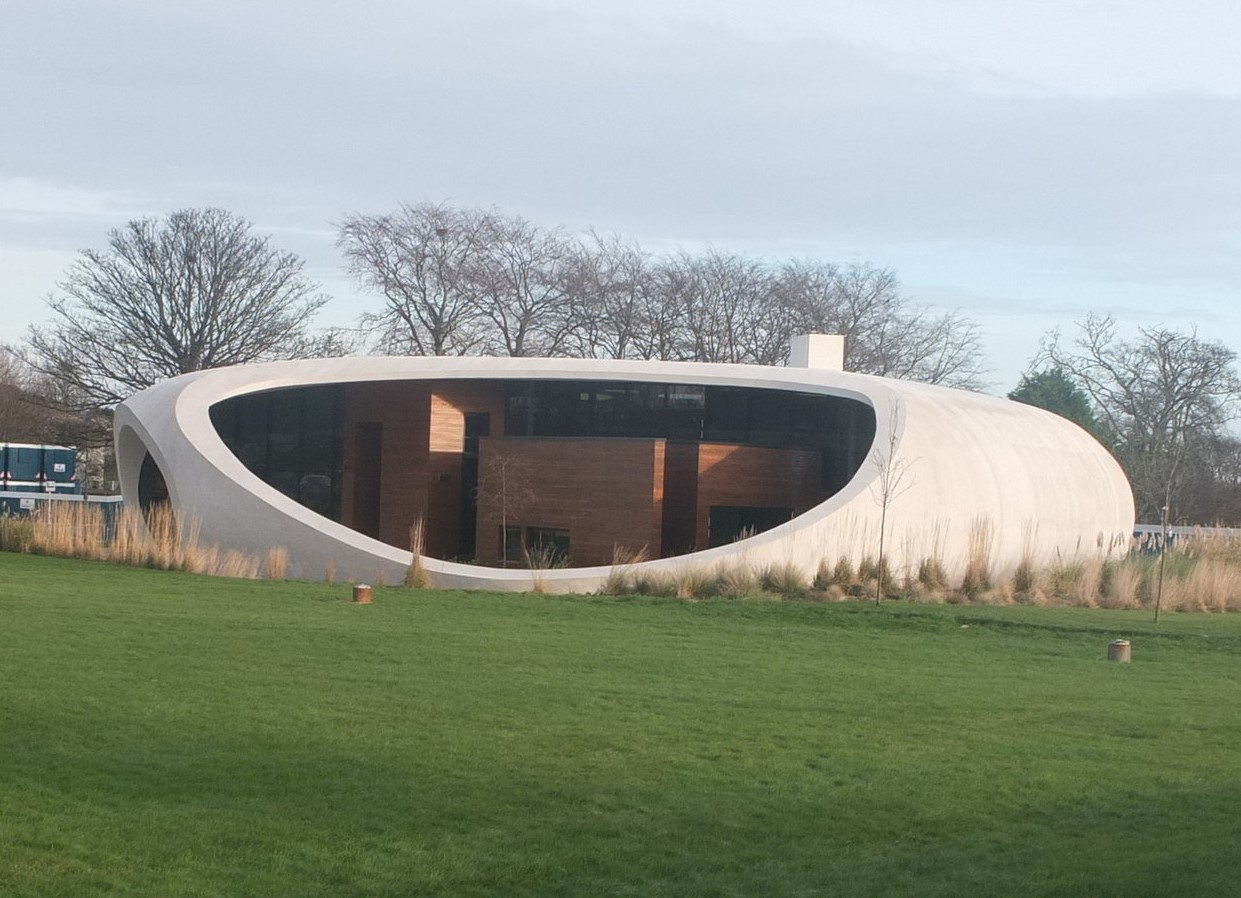
Maggie's Centre, Aberdeen

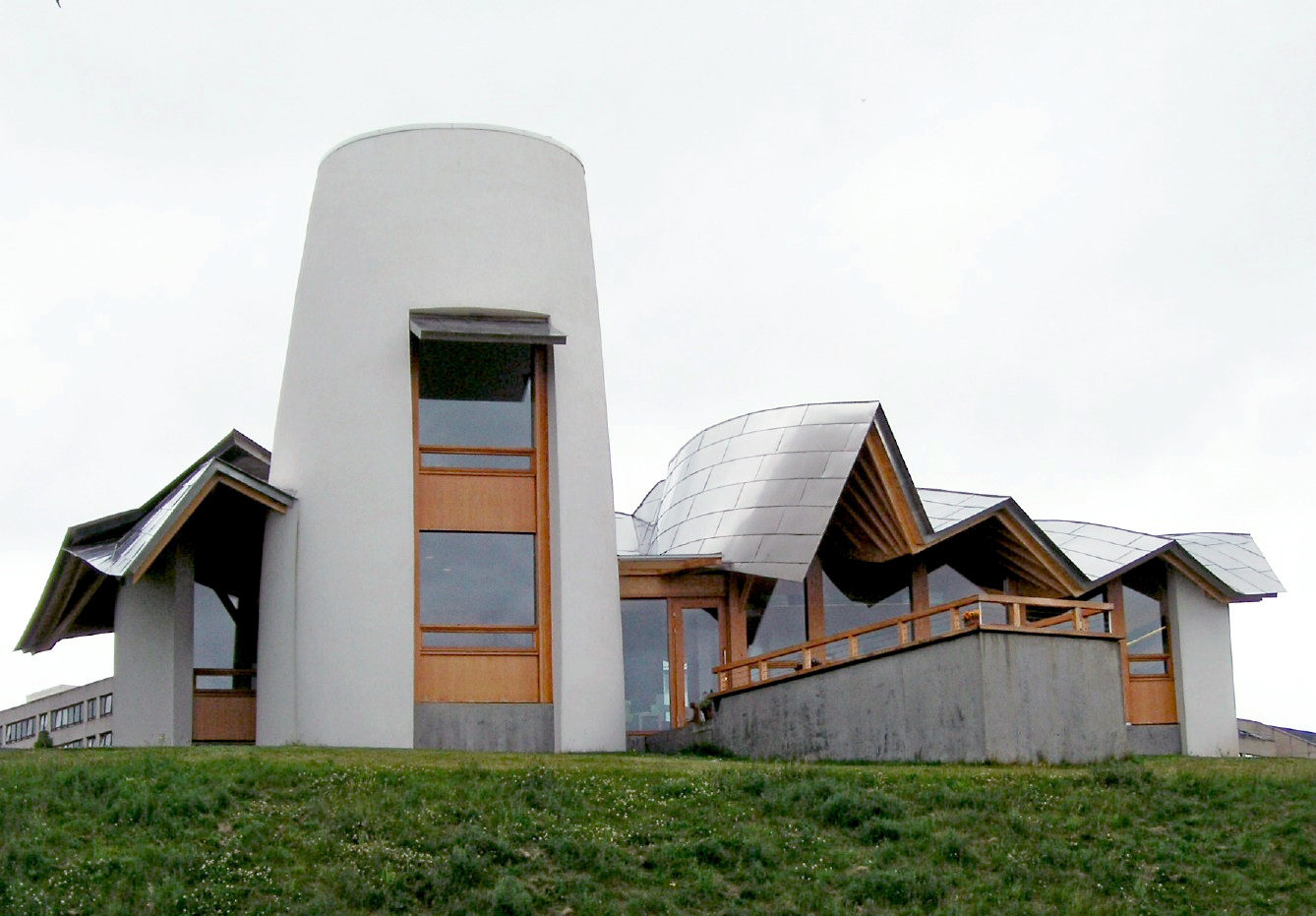
Maggie's Centre, Ninewells, Dundee

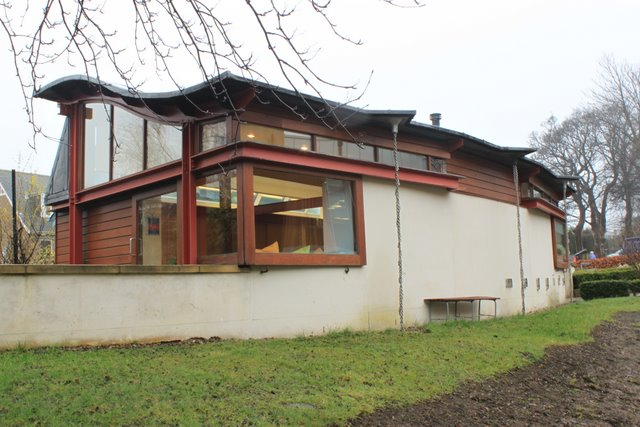
Maggie's Centre, Edinburgh

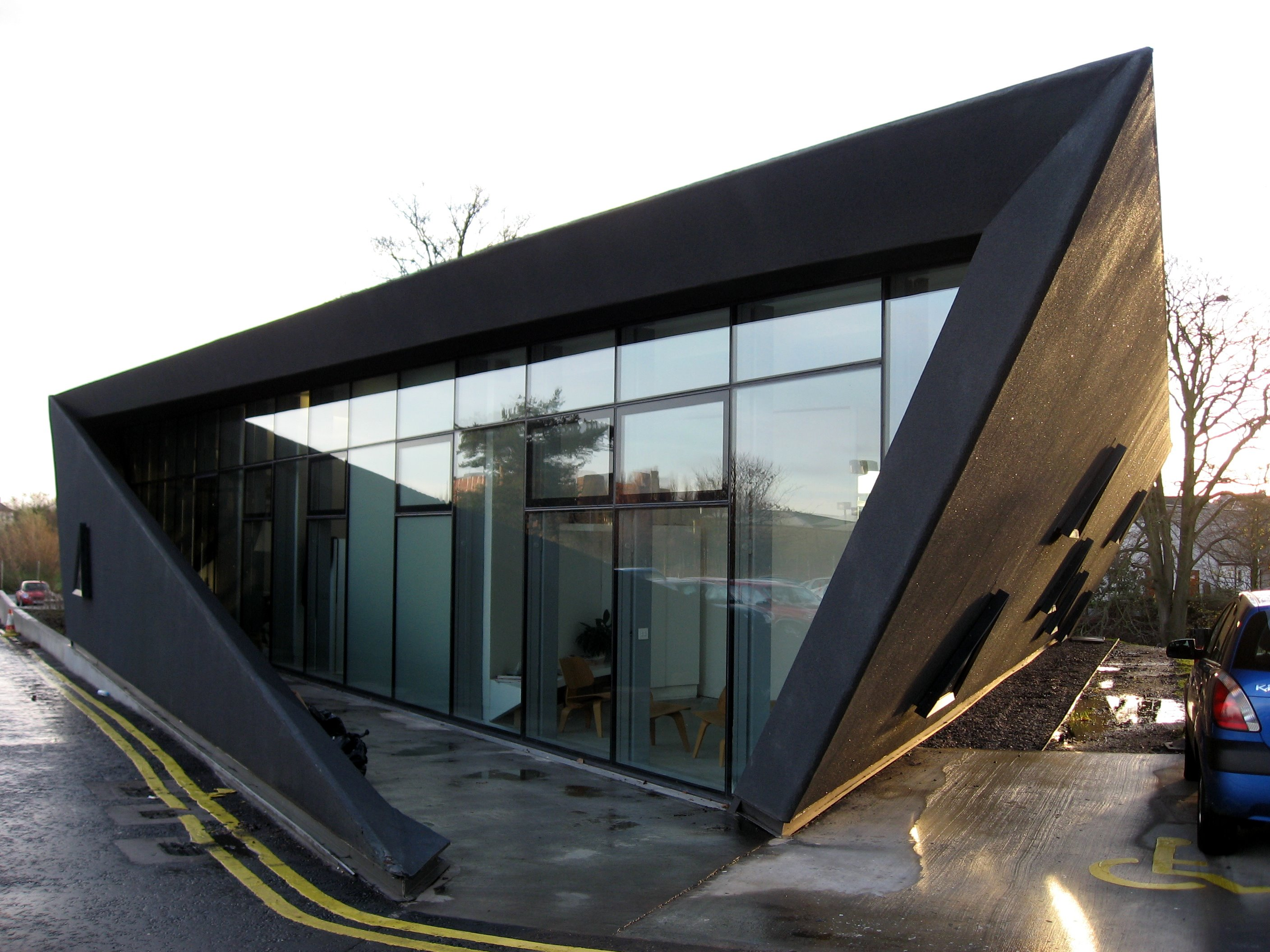
Maggie's Centre, Fife

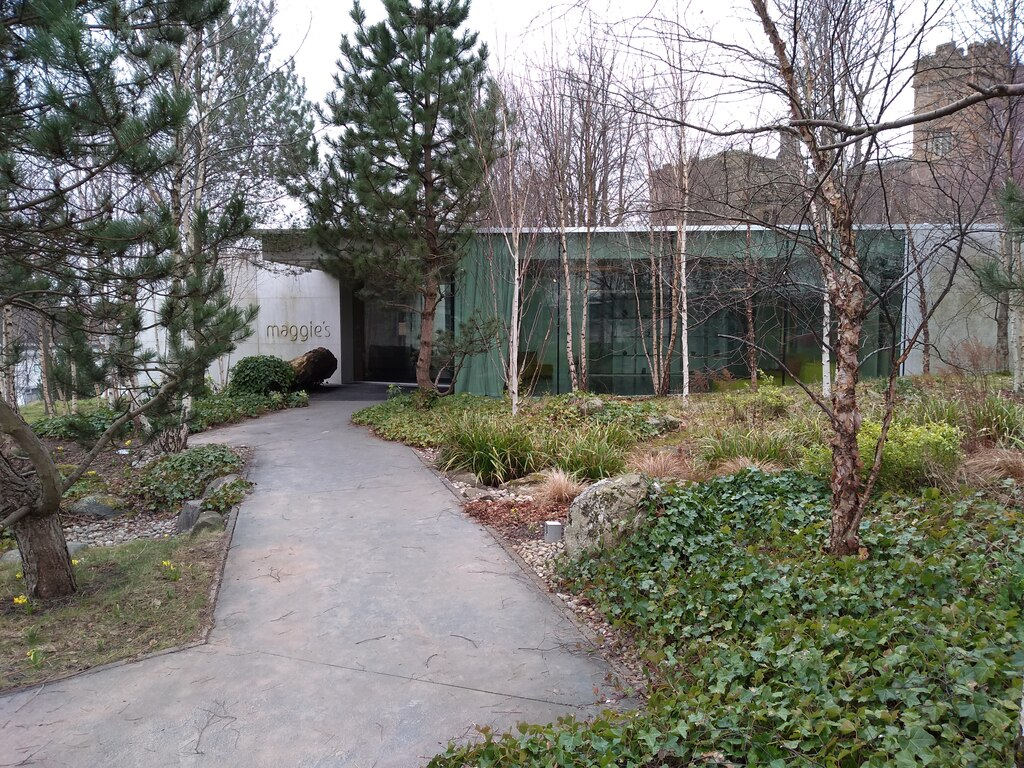
Maggie's Centre, Glasgow

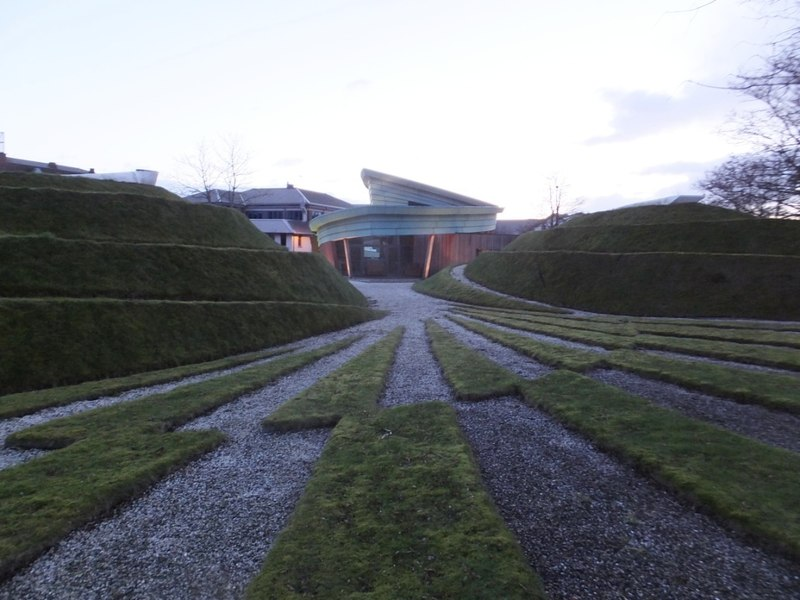
Maggie's Centre, Inverness

=== England ===
==== London ====
Maggie's West London was the first purpose-built Maggie's centre in England. It is located at Charing Cross Hospital, West London and opened in April 2008. The centre was designed by Rogers Stirk Harbour + Partners, and Dan Pearson designed the garden around the centre. In May 2009 the centre won a RIBA award for architectural excellence and was named as London Project of the Year. In October 2009 Richard Rogers and his team at Rogers Stirk Harbour + Partners were awarded the Stirling Prize for the building, and donated the £20,000 prize money to the cancer care centre.

Maggie's Royal Free opened in 2016 in an interim building at the Royal Free London NHS Foundation Trust. A new purpose-built centre, designed by Daniel Libeskind of Studio Libeskind, was officially opened in 2024 by Queen Camilla.

Maggie's Barts opened in 2017 on the site of St Bartholomew's Hospital and was designed by Steven Holl.

Maggie's Royal Marsden, designed by Ab Rogers Design, opened in 2019 at the Royal Marsden Hospital, Sutton.

==== Cheltenham ====
Maggie's Cheltenham, beside Cheltenham General Hospital, was opened by Camilla, Duchess of Cornwall in October 2010. The centre was designed by Sir Richard MacCormac of MJP Architects, and the landscaping by Dr Christine Facer.

==== Nottingham ====
Completed in 2011 Piers Gough's building for Nottingham's Maggies offers a "light, peaceful and non-institutional design (to) be a sanctuary for all those who walk through the door. Sheltered by trees, the centre (is) a homely, comfortable space next to the busy hospital, where anyone affected by cancer can come to relax. The centre is a safe space where visitors can engage with nature while being sheltered from the elements. From the outside the playful appearance entice(s) people to take a look through the door; once they do the harmony of light and space will create a uniquely welcoming environment." The interior was designed by fashion designer Paul Smith, who grew up in Nottingham.

==== Cambridge ====
Maggie's Cambridge opened in 2012 is an interim building on the site of Addenbrooke's Hospital.

==== Newcastle ====
Maggie's Newcastle is located at Freeman Hospital, a short walk from the Northern Centre for Cancer Care (NCCC) and was designed by RIBA Royal Gold Medallist, Ted Cullinan of Edward Cullinan Architects. It opened in 2013.

==== Oxford ====
Maggie's Oxford opened in 2014 at Churchill Hospital, Oxford. Its timber treehouse-style building and landscaped garden were designed to be integrated in the natural wildlife.

==== Wirral ====
Maggie's Wirral opened in 2014 in an interim centre in the grounds of Clatterbridge Hospital. On 5 February 2018 it was announced that two new Maggie's centres would be built, at the Clatterbridge Cancer Centre on the Wirral and the Royal Liverpool Hospital in the city centre, as part of a joint project with the Steve Morgan Foundation.

==== Manchester ====
Maggie's Manchester was designed by Foster and Partners and opened in April 2016 by the Christie Hospital.

==== Oldham ====
In 2017, Maggie's Oldham was built next to the Royal Oldham Hospital. The wooden building was designed by Alex de Rijke of dRMM and is held suspended over the garden below, supported by steel stilts.

==== Yorkshire ====
Maggie's Leeds was designed by Heatherwick Studio and opened in June 2020. It forms part of the city's St James's University Hospital.

==== Southampton ====
Maggie's Southampton opened in 2021 on the site of Southampton General Hospital and was designed by Amanda Levete.

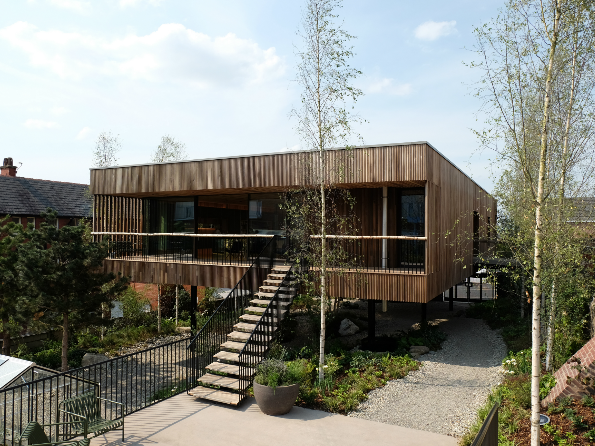
Maggie's Centre, Oldham

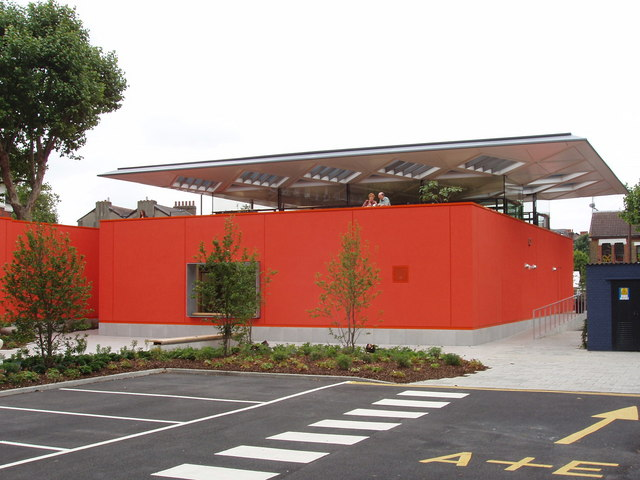
Maggie's Centre, London

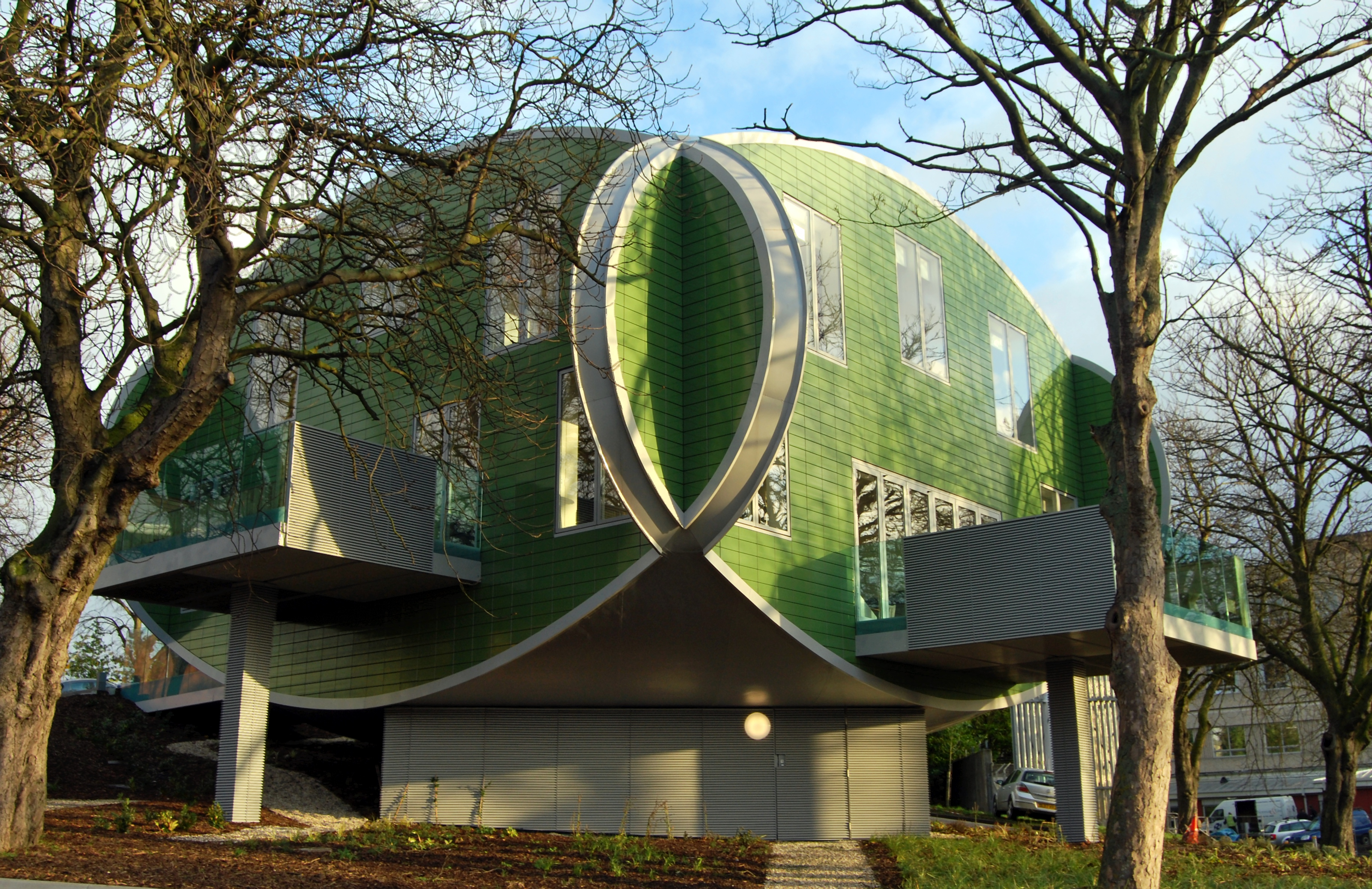
Maggie's Centre, Nottingham

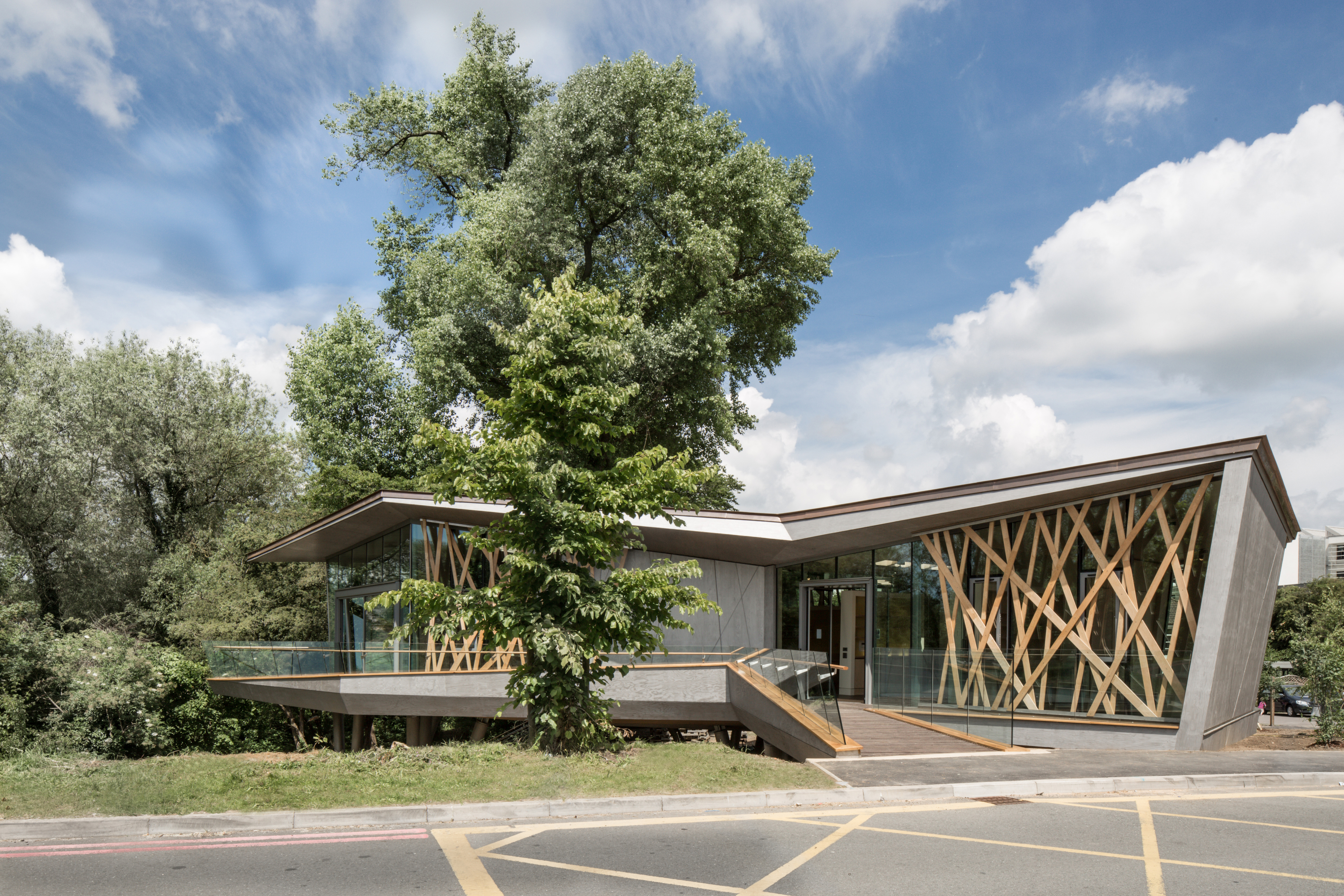
Maggie's Centre, Oxford

=== Wales ===
==== Swansea ====
Maggie's Swansea centre at Singleton Hospital, Swansea was designed by the late Japanese Architect Kisho Kurokawa shortly before his death in 2007. The centre was opened in December 2011 by First Minister Carwyn Jones in the presence of guests of honour including Japanese ambassador to the UK Keiichi Hayashi, the family of architect Kisho Kurokawa, and Welsh footballer John Hartson.

==== Cardiff ====
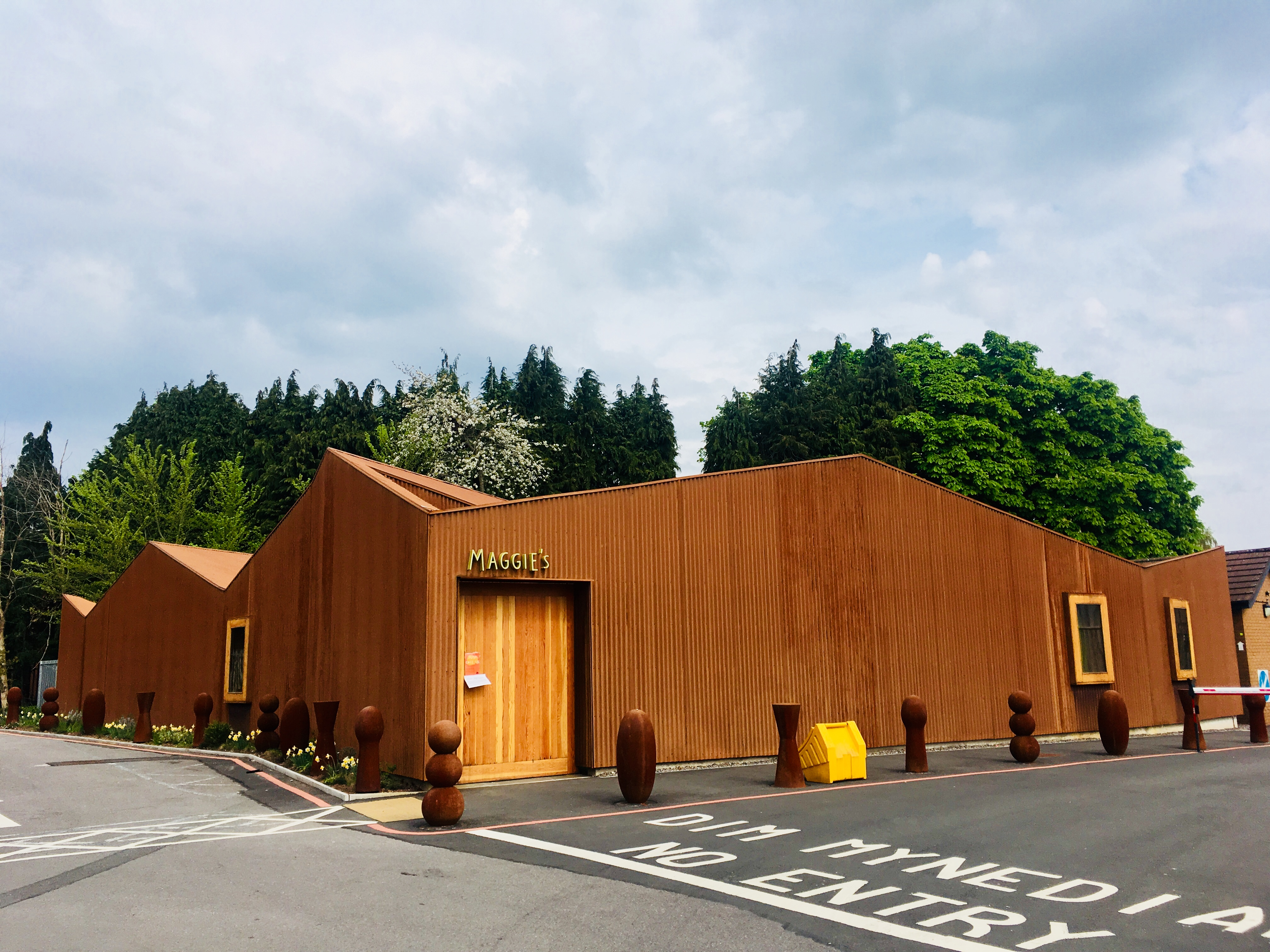
Maggie’s Centre, Cardiff

Plans for Wales' second Maggie's centre, for the Velindre Cancer Centre site in Cardiff, were revealed in 2014. The design was by Dow Jones Architects. Funding of £850,000 was made available by the Wales Government in 2017 to begin work on an interim Centre. The centre was officially opened by Camilla, Duchess of Cornwall, on 4 July 2019.

=== International ===
==== Hong Kong ====
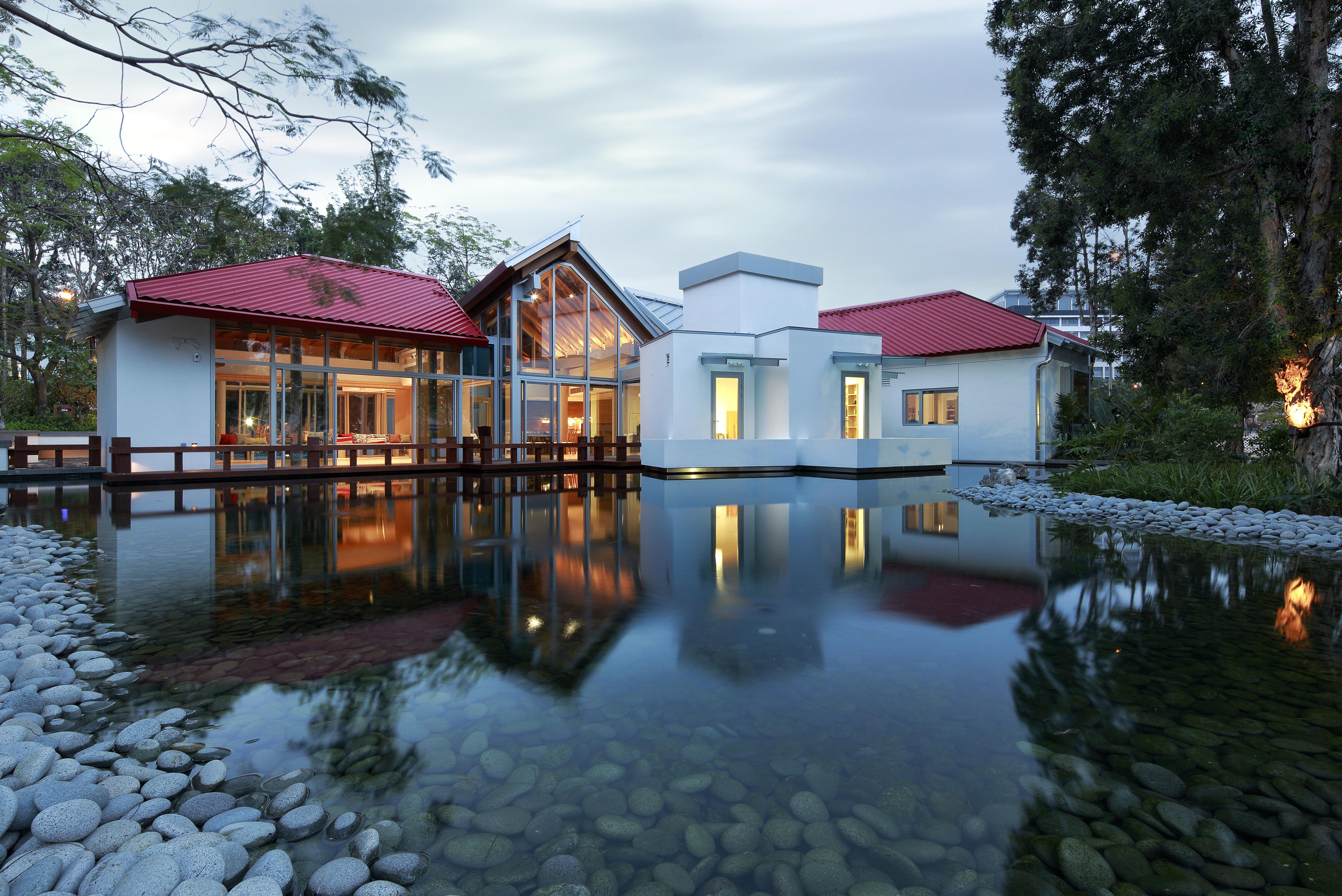
Maggie's Centre, Hong Kong

Maggie's Hong Kong was the first affiliated overseas Maggie's centre. It opened in a permanent location at Tuen Mun Hospital in March 2013, after operating from an interim site since 2008. The premises were designed by Frank Gehry and comprise the programme building surrounded by a tranquil outdoor environment.

==== Tokyo ====
Maggie's Tokyo opened in 2016. The main building was designed by Cosmos More, and an annex building designed by Nikken Sekkei.

==== Barcelona ====
Designed by architect Benedetta Tagliabue of the Miralles Tagliabue EMBT studio, the Maggie's centre Kálida Barcelona opened in 2019.

==== Netherlands ====
The first Maggie's centre in the Netherlands was opened in April 2024 at the University Medical Center Groningen. The building was designed by architect Marlies Rohmer, and the surrounding gardens were created by renowned landscape architect Piet Oudolf.

== See also ==
- Cancer in the United Kingdom
- List of works by Frank Gehry
