= RAC Limited =

British automotive services company

- Type: Private limited company
- Industry: Automotive services
- Founded: 1897
- Founder: Frederick Simms
- Headquarters: Walsall, England, UK
- Area served: United Kingdom, Republic of Ireland
- Key people: Robert Templeman (Chairman); David Hobday (CEO)
- Services: Roadside assistance and insurance
- Revenue: £501 million (2015)
- Operating income: £95 million (2011)
- Owner: CVC Capital Partners (50%); GIC Private Limited (50%)
- Number of employees: 3,700 (2011 average)
- Subsidiaries: RAC Motoring Services Limited; RAC Financial Services Limited; RAC Insurance limited
- Website: rac.co.uk

RAC Limited, trading as The RAC or simply RAC, is a British automotive services company headquartered in Walsall, England. Its principal services are roadside assistance and general insurance, and its subsidiaries include RAC Motoring Services Ltd, RAC Financial Services Ltd and RAC Insurance Limited. It was a private club owned by its members until sold in 1999, eventually acquired in 2014 and 2015 by GIC Private Limited and CVC Capital Partners. In 2022 Silver Lake acquired a stake in the group while leaving GIC and CVC as major stakeholders.

The RAC's main competitors for roadside assistance and vehicle recovery are The AA and Green Flag.

== History ==
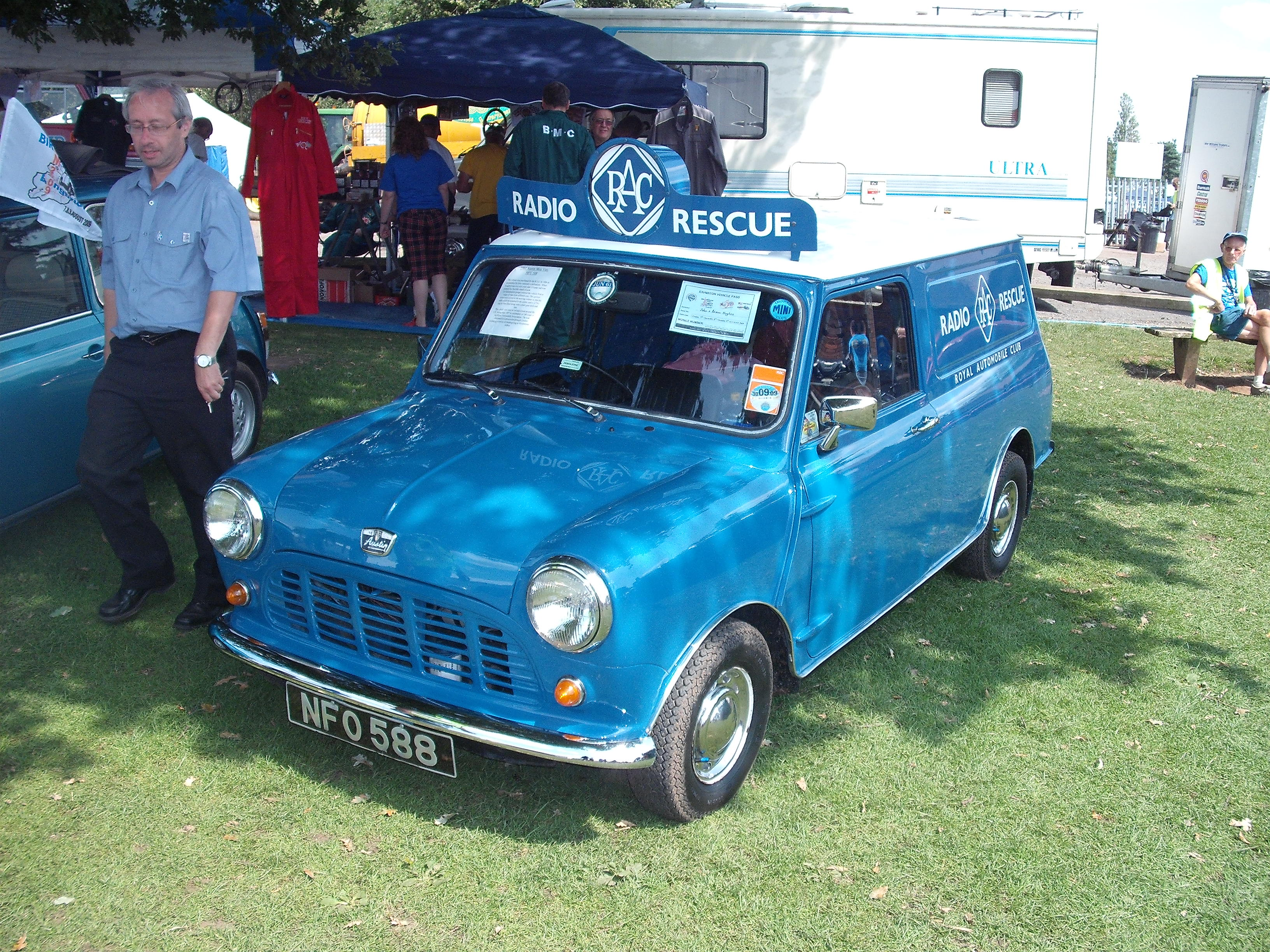
1961 RAC Austin Mini Van

The Royal Automobile Club was formed in 1897 by Frederick Richard Simms, which set up an "associate section" to provide members with roadside assistance and motoring services. The club incorporated the associate section as R.A.C. Motoring Services Ltd. in 1978. In 1987, the organisation introduced an "Advanced Computer Aided Rescue System".

In 1991, it established the RAC Foundation as its research arm. The RAC Foundation was later turned into a charity, and received a legacy from Royal Automobile Club members when R.A.C. Motoring Services Ltd. was sold in 1999. British School of Motoring (BSM) was purchased by R.A.C. Motoring Services Ltd. in December 1998.

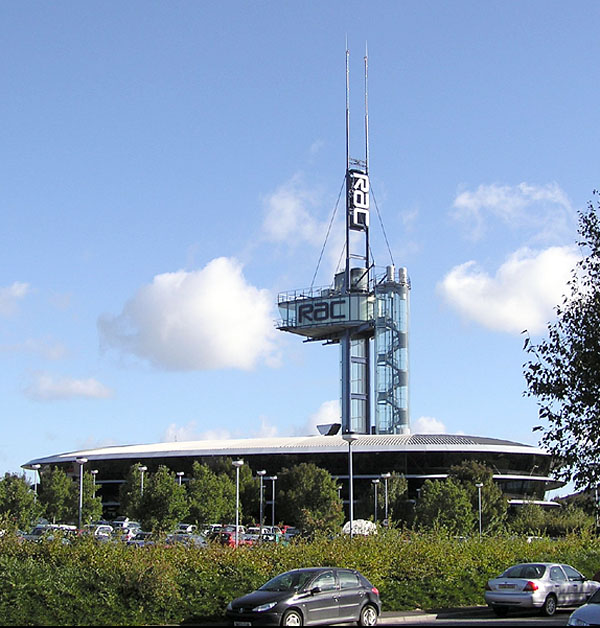
The RAC tower in Almondsbury, Bristol

The RAC moved into the RAC Regional Control Centre adjacent to the Almondsbury Interchange in 1994, designed by Grimshaw Architects.

In 1999, R.A.C. Motoring Services was sold by the members of the Royal Automobile Club to Lex Service for £437m, with each of the 12,000 members receiving £34,000, and each of the 4,000 RAC Motoring Services staff receiving £1,000.

Lex Service renamed themselves RAC plc in 2002. In October 2000, RAC purchased Intergraph's Computer Aided Dispatch System (I/CAD), a Command and Control system. The National Customer Service Awards' recognized the system with the 'Best Use of Technology in Customer Service' award in October 2004.

Aviva acquired RAC plc for around £1.1 billion in March 2005. They sold some parts of the business for £500m, including RAC Auto Windscreens in December 2008, and BSM to a German company in January 2009. BSM was later sold to Acromas Holdings, which owns The Automobile Association.

Aviva ceased providing loans under the RAC brand name in January 2008, and dissolved its partnership with The Co-operative Bank. Aviva sold the RAC to The Carlyle Group in June 2011. Although Carlyle had planned a stock market flotation for the RAC, in September 2014 Carlyle agreed to sell almost half its stake to Singapore's sovereign wealth fund GIC Private Limited. In December 2015, Carlyle agreed to sell its remaining stake to CVC Capital Partners, in a transaction valuing the RAC at £1.4 billion.

In 2022 Silver Lake acquired a holding in RAC Group but specific values were not publicly disclosed.

== Services ==
=== Roadside assistance ===
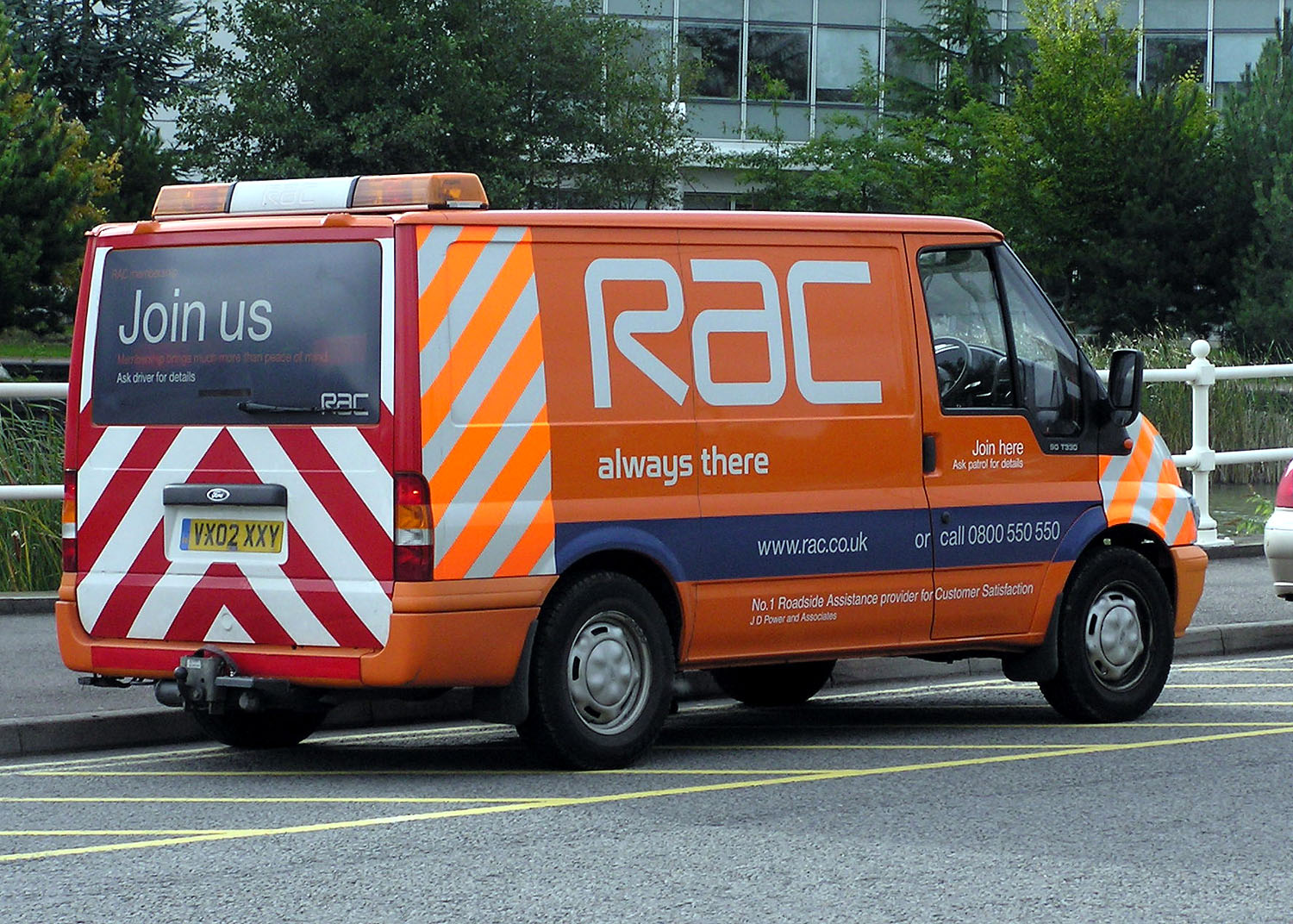
An RAC roadside assistance van

The RAC has around 2,000 patrols that attend 2.8 million breakdowns each year, this includes overseas breakdowns with RAC Europe. The RAC covers eight million roadside assistance customers, with 2.2 million individual members and 4.5 million corporate customers. Their breakdown assistance centres operate 24/7, and deal with approximately four million calls a year.

They have introduced, for trial, two hybrid vehicles, to cut fuel consumption and carbon emissions. In May 2009, a survey by J.D. Power ranked the RAC highest in "satisfying roadside assistance customers" for the fourth consecutive year. RAC Europe is breakdown cover for customers from the United Kingdom that travel to Europe.

RAC Europe covers forty seven European countries, and provides English speaking Incident Managers, available twenty four hours a day to assist. The office is based near Lyon, in Villeurbanne, France.

=== Other ===
RAC Vehicle Checks and Examinations conduct vehicle checks that show if a car has been stolen, written off, has outstanding finance or previous plates, is at risk of being sold illegally, and that its number plate and chassis number correspond.

RAC Vehicle Checks are conducted by Experian, while RAC Examinations Inspectors make physical checks on the car to make sure it is mechanically and structurally sound. The RAC also provides travel and traffic services including online route planners, in car navigation and help with travel documents.

== Motorsport ==
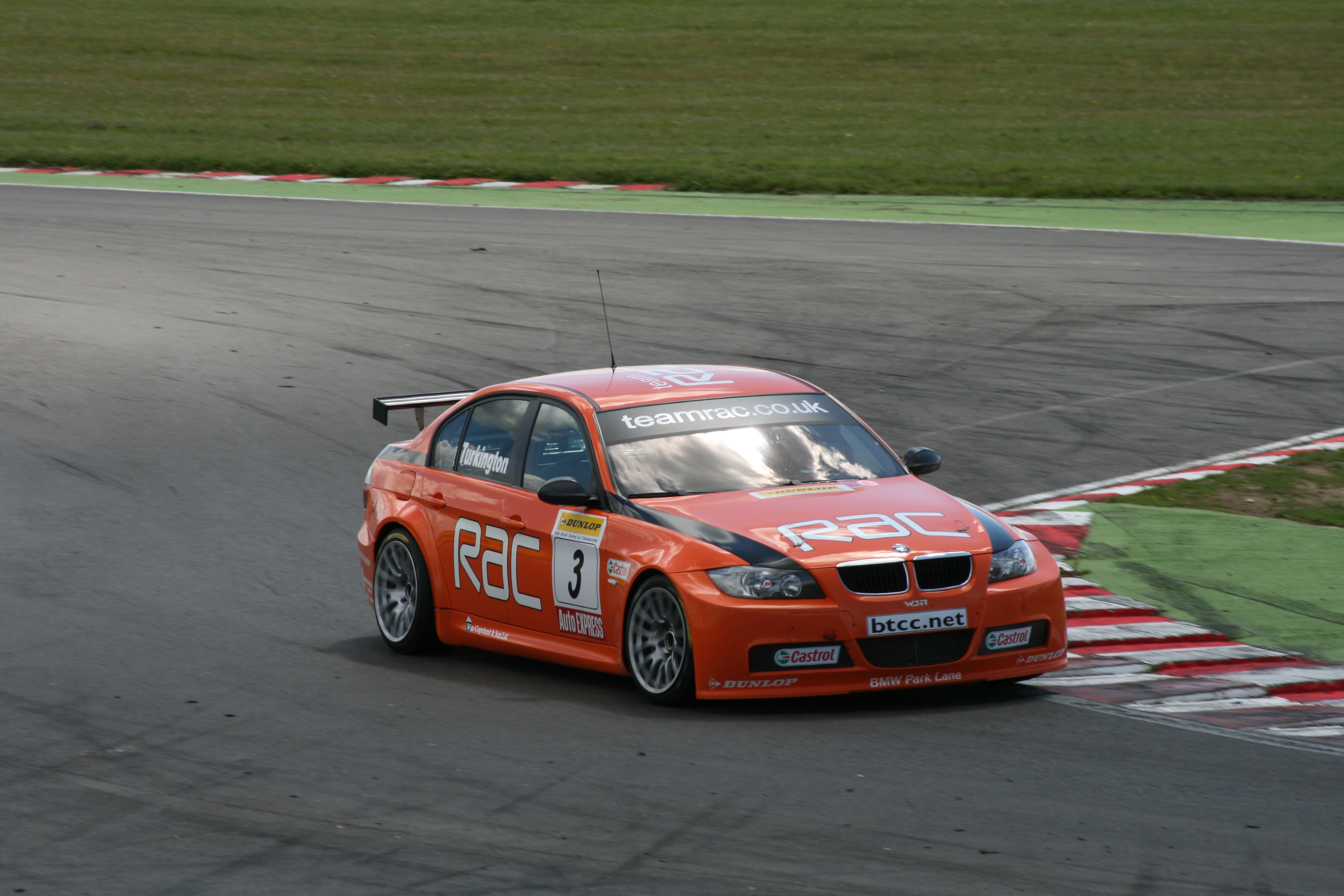
Colin Turkington driving for Team RAC BMW at Snetterton

In 2006, RAC teamed up with WSR (West Surrey Racing) to form Team RAC and to race in the British Touring Car Championship (BTCC) with two MG ZS cars and from 2007 onwards, two (and sometimes three) BMW E90 320si cars. The racing cars were liveried in RAC's corporate orange and have achieved a number of wins, including winning the BTCC Independent Drivers Championship with Colin Turkington in 2007, 2008 and 2009.

Turkington was also able to clinch the outright win in the 2009 BTCC Drivers Championship for Team RAC. For 2010, RAC reduced their level of sponsorship with the team.

== See also ==
- The AA
- Green Flag
- Vehicle recovery
