= Nicholas Grimshaw =

English architect (1939–2025)

Sir Nicholas Grimshaw CBE RA
- Born: 9 October 1939; Hove, East Sussex, England
- Died: 14 September 2025 (aged 85)
- Education: Wellington College; Edinburgh College of Art; Architectural Association School of Architecture
- Occupation: Architect
- Style: High-tech architecture (modernism)
- Spouse: Lavinia Russell (m. 1972)
- Children: 2

Sir Nicholas Grimshaw CBE RA (9 October 1939 – 14 September 2025) was an English architect, particularly noted for several modernist buildings, including London's Waterloo International railway station and the Eden Project in Cornwall. He was president of the Royal Academy from 2004 to 2011. He was chairman of Grimshaw Architects (formerly Nicholas Grimshaw & Partners) from its foundation to 2019, when he was succeeded by Andrew Whalley. He was a recipient of the RIBA Gold Medal.

== Early life and education ==
Nicholas Grimshaw was born in Hove, East Sussex, on 9 October 1939. His father, Thomas, was an aircraft engineer, and his mother, Hannah, a portrait painter and he inherited an interest in engineering and art. One of his great-grandfathers was a civil engineer who built dams in Egypt, and another (Thomas Wrigley Grimshaw) was a physician who campaigned for the installation of Dublin's drainage and sanitation system after showing a link between waterborne diseases and streams joining the River Liffey.

The artist John Atkinson Grimshaw was another of his ancestors.

Grimshaw's father died when he was two, and he grew up with his mother, a grandmother who was also a painter, and two sisters in Guildford. He displayed an early interest in construction; his boyhood interests included Meccano, building tree houses and boats.

Grimshaw was educated at Wellington College in Berkshire. From 1959 to 1962, he studied at the Edinburgh College of Art before winning a scholarship to attend the Architectural Association School of Architecture (AA) in London, where he won further scholarships to travel to Sweden in 1963 and the United States in 1964. While at the AA, he was influenced by professor Peter Cook, one of the founders of Archigram. Grimshaw graduated from the AA in 1965 with an honours diploma, and having entered into a partnership with Terry Farrell, he joined the Royal Institute of British Architects two years later in 1967.

== Career ==
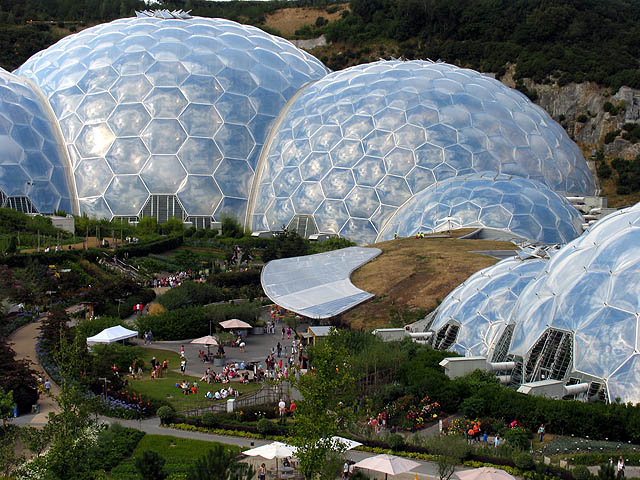
The Eden Project, designed by Nicholas Grimshaw

Grimshaw worked with Farrell for 15 years before establishing his own firm, Nicholas Grimshaw & Partners, in 1980. In 1989, he won a Royal Institute of British Architects national award for his design of the Financial Times printworks in east London. After designing Britain's pavilion for the Seville Expo in 1992, he was appointed a CBE in 1993, and the following year saw his Waterloo railway terminal awarded the accolade of RIBA President's Building of the Year as well as the Mies van der Rohe Award for European Architecture. 1994 also saw him elected a vice-chairman of the Architectural Association, a member of the Royal Academy and a member of the American Institute of Architects.

His architecture practice continued to grow, with offices in London, Paris, Los Angeles, New York, Dubai, Melbourne and Sydney. The work of Nicholas Grimshaw & Partners was the subject of a series of monographs published by Phaidon Press: Architecture, Industry and Innovation deals with the years 1965–1988; Structure, Space and Skin covers 1988–1993; and Equilibrium looks at work up until 2000.

In December 2004, Grimshaw was elected president of the Royal Academy of Arts, a position he held until 2011. Grimshaw's firm were the architects for the National Institute for Research into Aquatic Habitats (NIRAH). In 2019, Andrew Whalley succeeded Grimshaw as chairman of Grimshaw Architects.

== Style ==
Grimshaw was considered one of the pioneers of high-tech architecture, which grew out of the modernist movement.

Grimshaw cited 19th-century architects Joseph Paxton and Isambard Kingdom Brunel as influences, as well as the futurist style of Buckminster Fuller and the modernism of Charles and Ray Eames. Fuller's influence on Grimshaw is visible in the geodesic domes of the Eden Project, while Grimshaw's renovation of Paddington station paid homage to its original design by Brunel.

== Personal life and death ==
In 1972, Grimshaw married Lavinia Russell, an expert on Chinese culture and the daughter of art critic John Russell and Countess Alexandrine Apponyi. Nicholas and Lavinia Grimshaw went on to have two daughters, both born in the 1970s.

Nicholas Grimshaw died on 14 September 2025, at the age of 85. His collaborator Terry Farrell also died that month.

== Projects ==
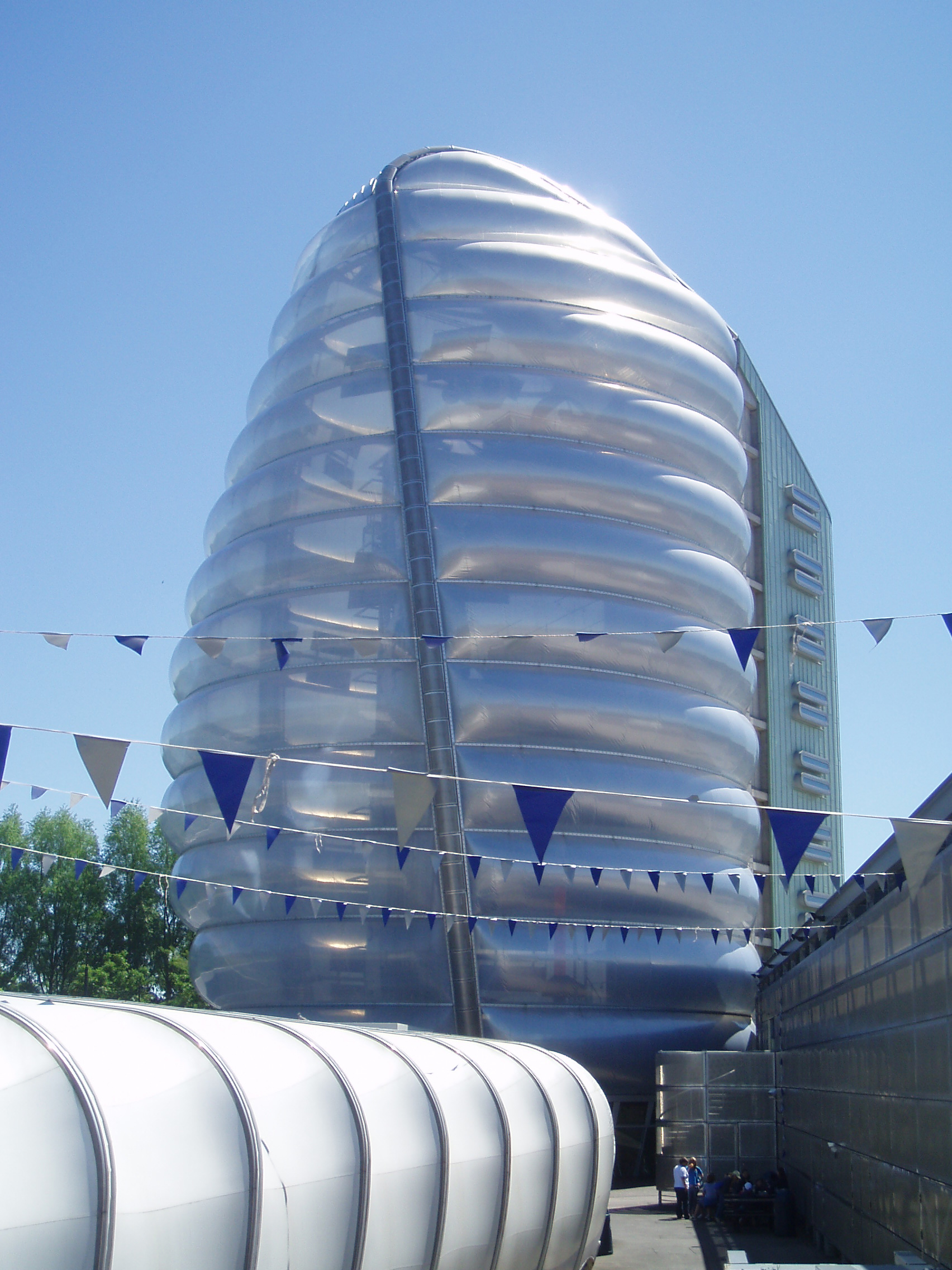
National Space Centre, Leicester

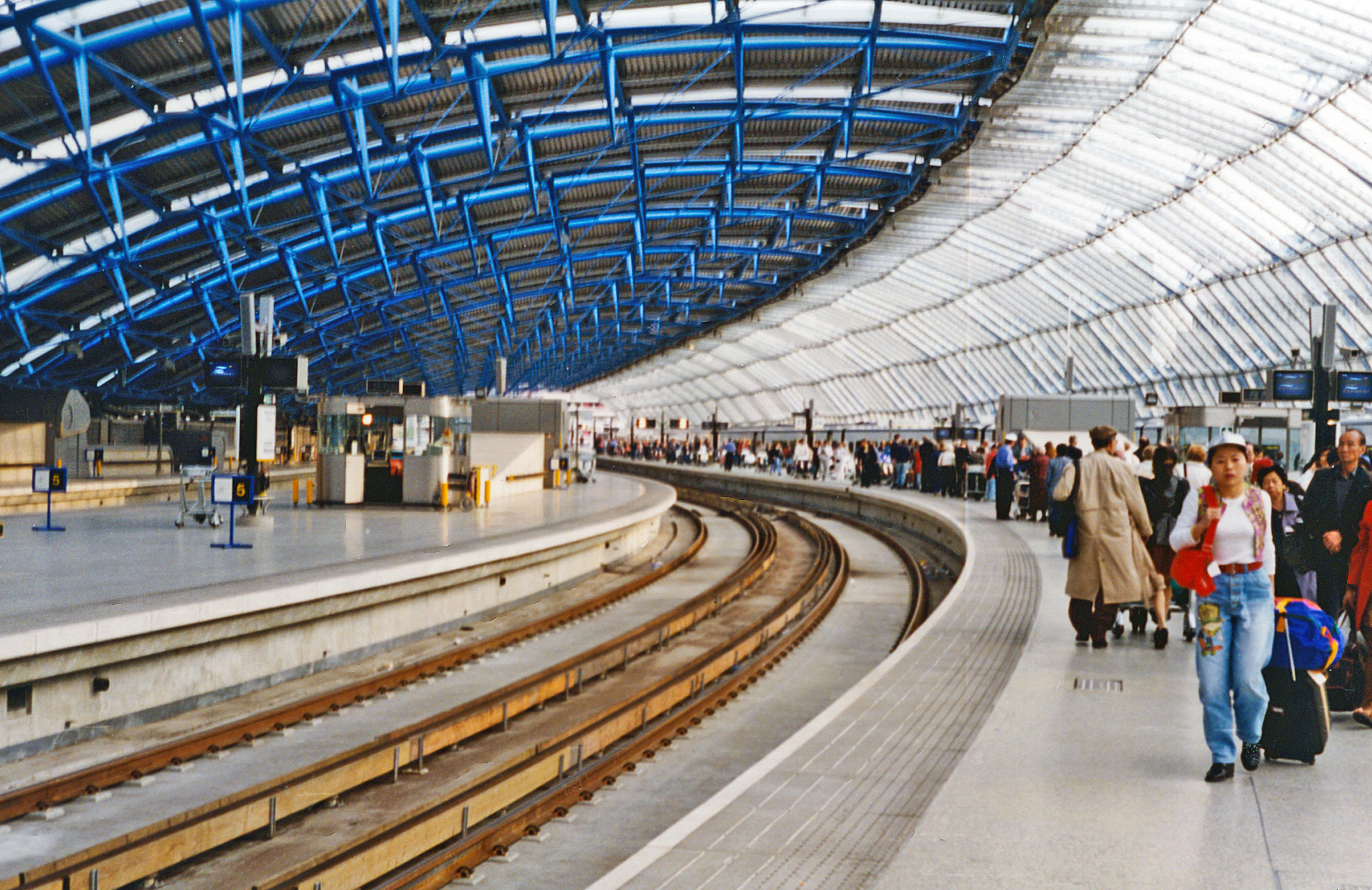
Waterloo International railway station

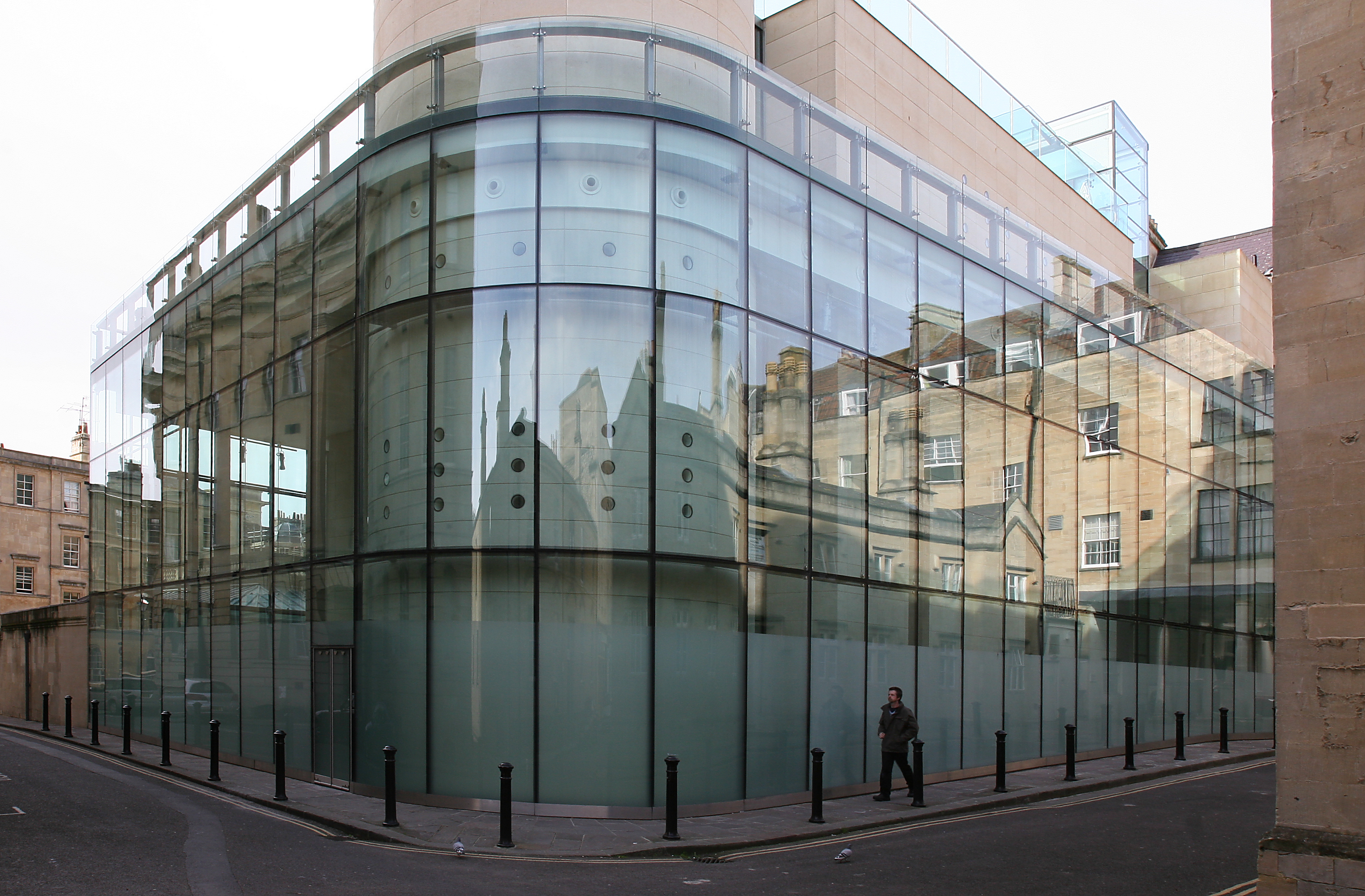
Thermae Bath Spa: the main building, 2006

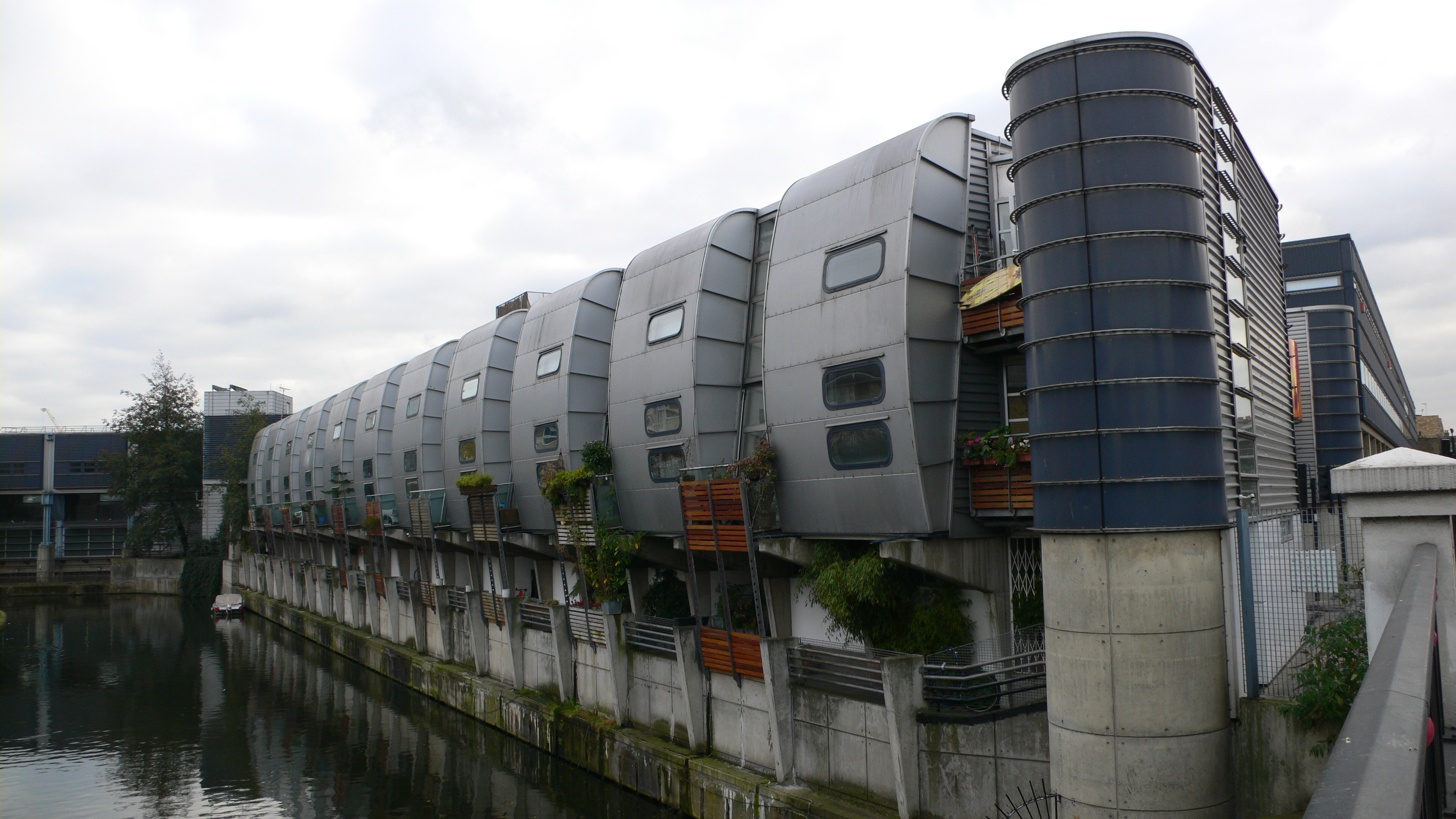
Grand Union Walk Housing – Flats behind Sainsbury's supermarket, Camden Town, 1988

Projects include:

- 125 Park Road, London (1970); joint project with Terry Farrell
- Herman Miller Factory, Bath (1976); joint project with Terry Farrell
- BMW (UK) headquarters, Bracknell (1979); joint project with Terry Farrell
- Oxford Ice Rink, Oxford (1984)
- Clifton Hill Sports Centre, Exeter (1984)
- Financial Times Printworks, Blackwall, London (1988)
- Rank Xerox Research Centre, Welwyn Garden City (1988)
- Sainsbury's supermarket, Camden Town, London (1988)
- Stockbridge Leisure Centre, Liverpool (1988)
- British Pavilion Expo '92, Seville, Spain (1992)
- Waterloo International railway station, London (1993)
- Compass Centre, Heathrow Airport (1993)
- South West Media Group (Western Morning News, Plymouth Herald) Headquarters and Printworks. Known as "The Ship", Derriford, Plymouth (1993)
- RAC Regional Headquarters, Bristol (1994)
- Pier 4A, Heathrow Airport (1993)
- Berlin Stock Exchange (Ludwig Erhard Haus), Berlin, Germany (1998)
- Lord's Cricket Ground Grandstand, London (1998)
- North Woolwich pumping station, London Docklands (1988)
- Bilbao bus station, Bilbao, Spain (1996)
- Paddington station redevelopment, London (1999)
- Amsterdam Bijlmer ArenA station (2000–2007)
- Eden Project, Cornwall (2001)
- Frankfurt Trade Fair Hall, Frankfurt, Germany (2001)
- Enneus Heerma Bridge, Amsterdam, Netherlands (2001)
- National Space Centre, Leicester (2001)
- Donald Danforth Plant Science Center, St. Louis, United States (2002)
- 25 Gresham Street, London (2003)
- Rolls-Royce Motor Cars Goodwood plant and headquarters (2003)
- Five Boats, Duisburg, Germany (2005)
- Zurich Airport Expansion (2004)
- The Core, Eden Project (2005)
- Southern Cross railway station, Melbourne, Australia (2007)
- Caixa Galicia Art Gallery, A Coruña, Spain (2006)
- Thermae Bath Spa, Bath (2006)
- Experimental Media and Performing Arts Center, Troy, New York (2008)
- igus Headquarters and Factory, Cologne, Germany (2000)
- University College London Cancer Institute, England (2007)
- London School of Economics New Academic Building, England (2008)
- London South Bank University K2 (Keyworth II) Building, England (2009)
- Eco Hotel Concept, United States (2011)
- St Botolph Building, London, England (2010)
- Mobilizarte Mobile Pavilion, Brazil (2012)
- Cutty Sark conservation project, London, England (2012)
- Fulton Center, Manhattan, New York (2014)
- Pulkovo Airport, Saint Petersburg, Russia (2014)

== Awards and honours ==
Grimshaw was made a Knight Bachelor in the 2002 New Year Honours for services to architecture. He received an honorary doctorate from Heriot-Watt University in 2004. He received the RIBA Royal Gold Medal in 2019.

== Bibliography ==
- Moore, Rowan, ed. (1993). Structure, Space and Skin: The Work of Nicholas Grimshaw & Partners. London: Phaidon. ISBN 9780714828503.
- Amery, Colin (1995). Architecture, Industry and Innovation: The Early Work of Nicholas Grimshaw & Partners. London: Phaidon. ISBN 9780714839349.
- Pearman, Hugh (2000). Equilibrium: The Work of Nicholas Grimshaw & Partners. London: Phaidon. ISBN 0714839582.
- Grimshaw, Nicholas; Davey, Peter (2009). Farthing, Stephen (ed.). The Sketchbooks of Nicholas Grimshaw. London: Royal Academy of Arts. ISBN 9781905711628.

Cultural offices
Preceded by Phillip King	President of the Royal Academy; 2004–2011	Succeeded by Christopher Le Brun
