= Thermae Bath Spa =

Commercial spa in Bath, Somerset

Coordinates: 51.38037°N 2.36157°W

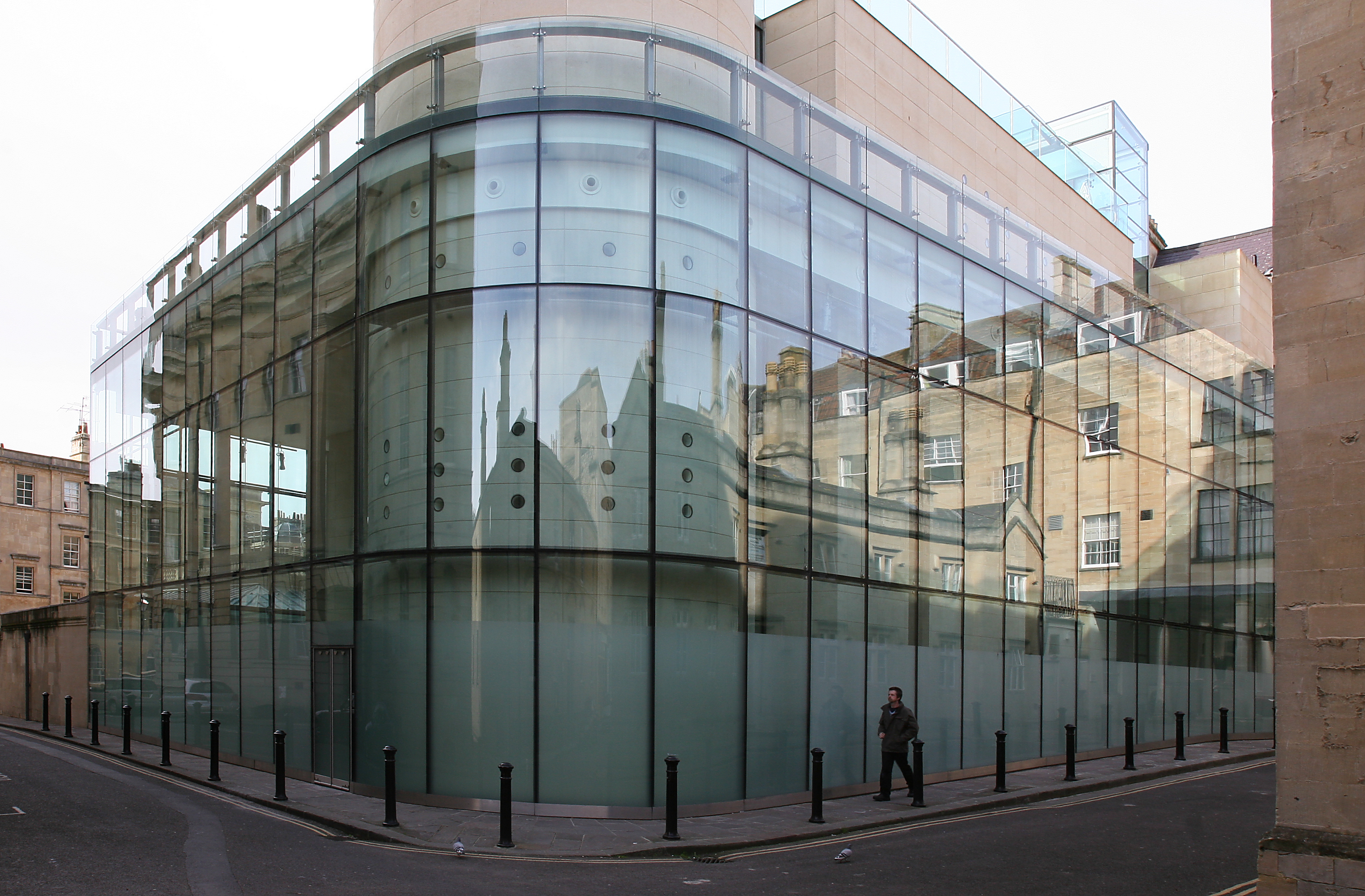
Thermae Bath Spa: the main building by Grimshaw Architects

Thermae Bath Spa is a combination of the historic spa and a contemporary building in the city of Bath, England, and reopened in 2006. Bath and North East Somerset council own the buildings, and, as decreed in a royal charter of 1590, are the guardians of the spring waters, which are the only naturally hot, mineral-rich waters in the UK. The Spa is operated by YTL Hotels.

The main spa building, the New Royal Bath, was designed by Grimshaw Architects and is constructed in Bath stone, enclosed by a glass envelope. It has two natural thermal baths, an open-air rooftop pool and an indoor pool, and a large wellness suite with two aromatic steam rooms, an ice chamber, infrared sauna and a celestial relaxation room. It also has a cafe, three relaxation areas, and 27 spa treatment rooms, including the 18th century hot bath, in which water-based massage such as Watsu takes place. The separate Cross Bath is a grade I listed Georgian building containing one open-air thermal bath.

== History ==
One of the city's main attractions has long been its famous hot spa water, fed by the area's hot springs. The Bath springs are the warmest geothermal springs found in the UK. These natural geothermal mineral springs fed into the Roman Baths complex, which was responsible for the prominence of Bath in the Roman period, as well as for the later development of Bath as the country's leading eighteenth and early nineteenth-century health resort. In the middle of the 20th century, the city's swimming pool sourced its water directly from the King's Spring through one of three pipelines beneath the River Avon. However, the old municipal hot pools were closed in 1978 after the discovery of Naegleria fowleri, an infectious organism, in one stratum of the aquifer. After that date, bathing was prohibited.

== Development ==
With the approach of the year 2000, money from the National Lottery-funded Millennium Commission was made available towards a major project to reopen a safe commercial spa once more, supplemented by funds from subscribers and from the local authority.

Originally planned to open in 2002, and despite a formal opening with the aid of the Three Tenors in 2003, the project ran seriously behind schedule and over budget as a result of a variety of legal disputes with contractors: the project's budgeted costs spiralled from an estimated £13 million in September 1996 to a final cost of £45 million.

== Present day ==
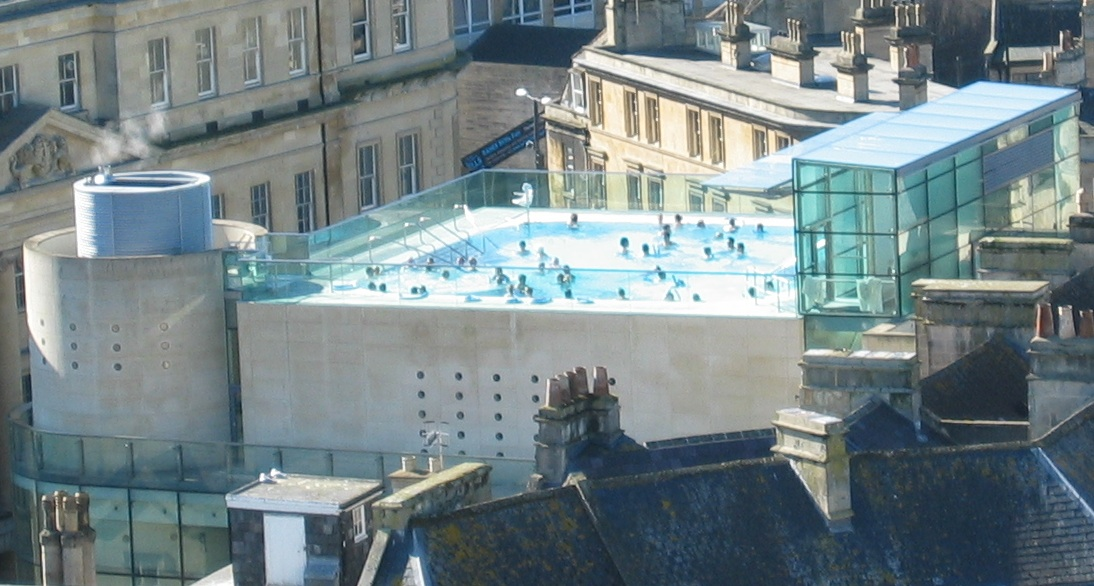
The spa's rooftop pool seen from Bath Abbey

Thermae Bath Spa eventually opened to the public on 7 August 2006, ending a 28-year period during which the waters remained unavailable for bathing.

The spa is largely sited in a new 'Glass Cube' building by Sir Nicholas Grimshaw, near the site of the ancient Royal Bath, which has been interlinked with historic Georgian spa buildings such as the nearby Hot and Cross Baths. The building is in a strongly contemporary style in contrast to its Georgian surroundings. The complex houses both traditional and modern spa facilities.

A 2014 survey indicated the spa attracted an extra 260,000 visitors a year to Bath, who contributed an extra £15 million a year to Bath's economy.
