= RAC Regional Control Centre =

Office building in Bradley Stoke, England

Coordinates: 51.5495°N 2.5576°W

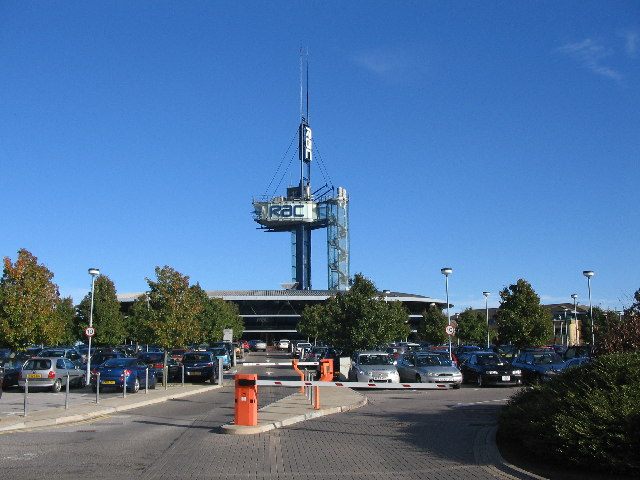
- Interactive map of the RAC Regional Control Centre area

General information
- Status: Completed
- Type: Office, control centre
- Architectural style: High-tech
- Location: Bradley Stoke, Bristol, England, Great Park Road, Bradley Stoke, Bristol BS32 4QN
- Construction started: 1993
- Completed: 1994
- Client: RAC Motoring Services Ltd

Height
- Height: 60 m (including spires)

Design and construction
- Architect: Nicholas Grimshaw
- Architecture firm: Grimshaw Architects
- Structural engineer: Alan Baxter Associates
- Civil engineer: Ove Arup & Partners, Edwards Gale
- Quantity surveyor: Hanscomb Ltd
- Main contractor: Bovis

The RAC Regional Control Centre is an operations and administration building located in Bradley Stoke, England. Designed by Grimshaw Architects and completed in 1994, it serves as the South West regional headquarters for RAC Limited. The building forms part of Almondsbury Business Park at the northern edge of the Bristol North Fringe. It is one of the RAC’s three principal regional centres, the others being located at Bescot and Stretford. While Bescot serves as the primary operations hub for vehicle breakdown response, the Bradley Stoke site accommodates administrative and customer service functions. When fully staffed, the building supports approximately 800 employees.

== History ==
The RAC Regional Control Centre was developed during the early 1990s as part of the expansion of Almondsbury Business Park in South Gloucestershire. Construction began in 1993 and was completed the following year. The project team included Grimshaw Architects, Alan Baxter Associates, Arup, and Bovis as main contractor.

Early sketches produced by Nicholas Grimshaw in March 1993 show conceptual designs exploring triangular layouts and suspended structures, which can be seen in the present building’s footprint and elevated meeting room.

In 2013, the centre attracted media attention when changes to pay structure of employees in the call centre prompted criticism from staff. Under the ownership of the Carlyle Group, performance-based contracts were introduced, reportedly reducing some base salaries by up to 28 per cent.

== Design ==
The building occupies a site immediately south of the Almondsbury Interchange and was conceived to serve both functional and symbolic roles for the RAC. It comprises three floors of office accommodation arranged around a full-height central atrium, encircled by glazed meeting rooms. The internal layout, based on a concentric triangular plan, was designed to promote interdepartmental communication.

Architecturally, the structure reflects the high-tech design principles characteristic of Nicholas Grimshaw’s practice. It shares stylistic elements with the earlier Western Morning News building in Plymouth. The building was intended not only as a technologically advanced and energy-efficient workplace but also as a highly visible landmark for motorway users. It is readily identifiable from much of Bradley Stoke and by travellers approaching Bristol via the M5.

The structure reaches a height of approximately 60 metres, including two blue steel masts that suspend a glazed meeting room known as the Central Viewing Room, or informally as the Crow's Nest. These masts are fitted with red navigation beacons. A nautical motif runs throughout the design, including porthole-style door windows, exposed gangways, and the elevated Viewing Room, which offers wide-ranging views across the Bristol region and into South Wales.

The façade consists of 718 panes of 30 mm-thick glazing, each weighing approximately 250 kg and collectively valued at over £1.7 million at the time of installation. Interior amenities include a staff café, a rain-fed koi pond, and dedicated workspaces for training, legal, sales, insurance, and marketing functions. The Central Viewing Room is situated approximately 30 metres above ground level. The RAC structure is considered a purpose-built building of architectural significance, developed to support the organisation’s regional operations with specialist infrastructure.

== See also ==
- Grimshaw Architects
- RAC Limited
- Architecture of the United Kingdom
