= Museum of Steel =

Coordinates: 25°40′41″N 100°17′00″W

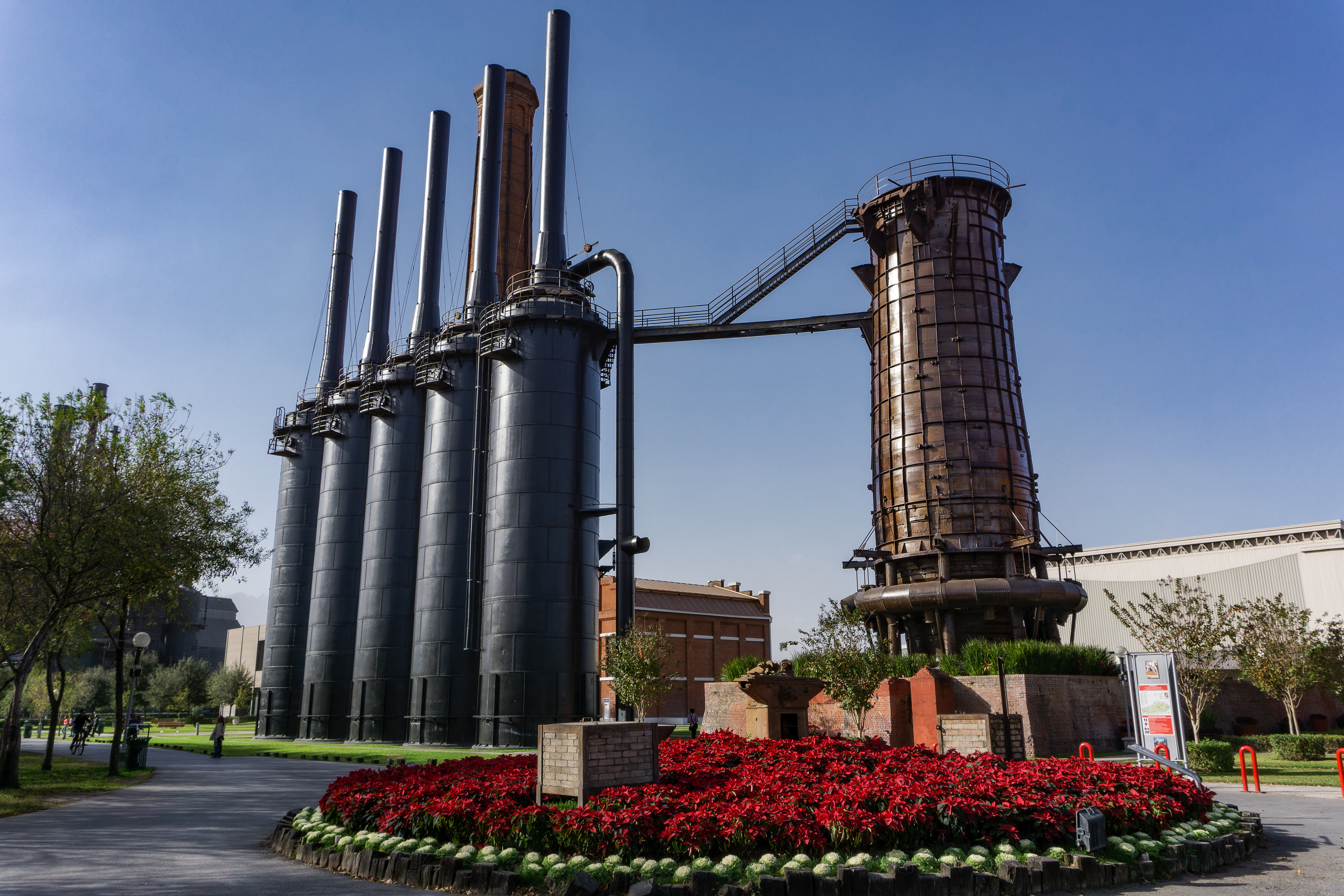

The Museum of Steel, known as the Museo del Acero, is located in the city of Monterrey, Nuevo León, Mexico. The Museo del Acero is one of the largest museums ever created in Mexico. It is located on the site of the very large Fundidora steel plant that was decommissioned in the mid 1980s. For 80 years, the Fundidora plant was an important part of the economic and social fabric of this city of 3.7 million people, and its conversion to a major educational facility has been very well received.

The new museum, built in and around a decommissioned blast furnace, has emerged as a new focal point for the region The newly restored 230-foot (70 m)-high blast furnace Horno No. 3, the city’s most recognizable icon dominating the Monterrey skyline, makes the museum unique. The Oficina de Arquitectura partnered with Grimshaw Architects and exhibit designers AldrichPears Associates to create a museum, while preserving its historical character. New galleries include: Gallery of History, Gallery of Steel, The Blast Furnace Show and the Cast Hall.

The Museo del Acero opened in the Fundidora Park in the fall of 2007.

== Sources ==
- van Uffelen, Chris (2010). Contemporary Museums - Architecture, History, Collections. Braun Publishing. ISBN 978-3-03768-067-4.
