= 125 Park Road =

Residential building in Westminster, London, England

Coordinates: 51°31′42″N 0°09′58″W

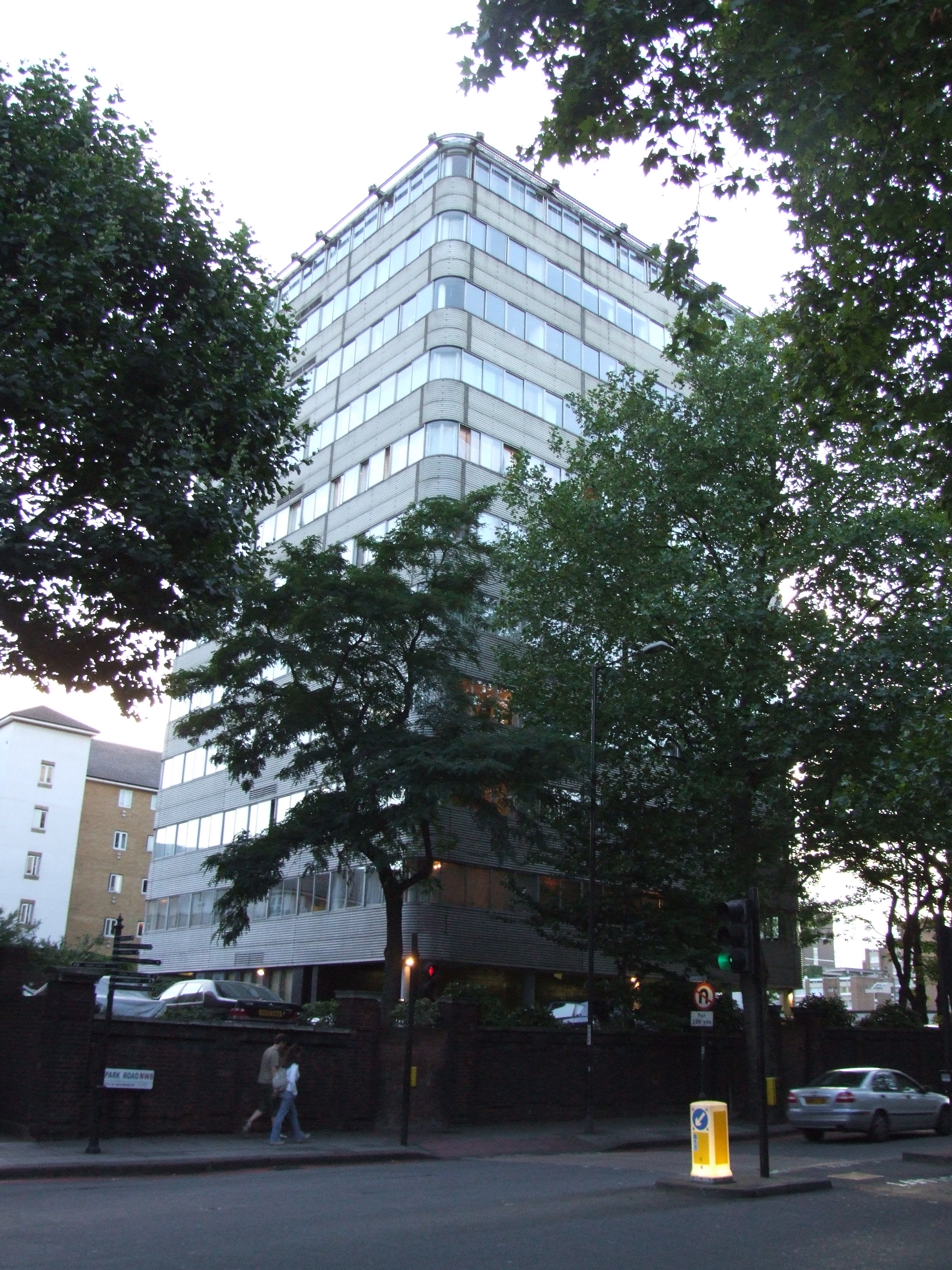
125 Park Road

125 Park Road is a listed building in Westminster, London, England. Occupying a prominent site opposite the Hanover Gate entrance to Regent's Park, the 11 storey block of flats has 18 two bedroom, 18 one bedroom, four penthouse and one caretaker's flat. Three quarters (75%) of the 41 flats have views over the park. The block was one of the first funded and built on the co-ownership principle made possible by the formation of the Housing Corporation in 1964. Lessees contributed to a group mortgage and received a premium payment when they left. This was designed to reflect the increase in the value of the flat during their stay.

== Architects ==
125 Park Road was designed in the late 1960s by the architects Farrell/Grimshaw Partnership for the Mercury Housing Society. Both Sir Terry Farrell and Sir Nicholas Grimshaw were members of the society and lived in the block. It was their second scheme and, when listed in 2001, was commended for pioneering the British High Tech architecture movement. The block was completed in June 1970 at a contract cost of £227,000.

== Design ==
The building is widely known for its corrugated aluminium cladding, round corners and sloping glazed roof. The exterior belies the light and spacious interiors of the flats. Living space is maximised by concentrating bathrooms, lifts and stairs in a central structural core. Natural light is maximised by placing the freestanding perimeter columns behind continuous window glazing. Curved corners add the sensation of panoramic views over London. Most internal walls are non-loadbearing which allows flats to be combined as larger units. This shows the benefits of designing residential accommodation on the same principles as commercial offices where habitable space is freed by concentrating services in a central core.

== Recognition and reputation ==
In 1973, the flats were highly commended in the Housing Design Awards sponsored by the Secretary of State for the Environment.

Increasingly, features about the building and individual flats started to appear in Sunday colour supplements and architectural magazines such as Building Design and Architectural Design. One of the penthouses was used as a film location, other flats were used for magazine and advertisement shoots. The inclusion of 125 Park Road in guides to modern British and London architecture, in Elain Harwood's England: A Guide to Post-war Listed Buildings and in Colin Amery's monograph on the early work of Nicholas Grimshaw helped to make the block a destination for visiting architects and students. It is now widely recognised as the first residential block designed on the office block principle of maximising habitable space around an easily accessible central service core.
