= Andrew Whalley =

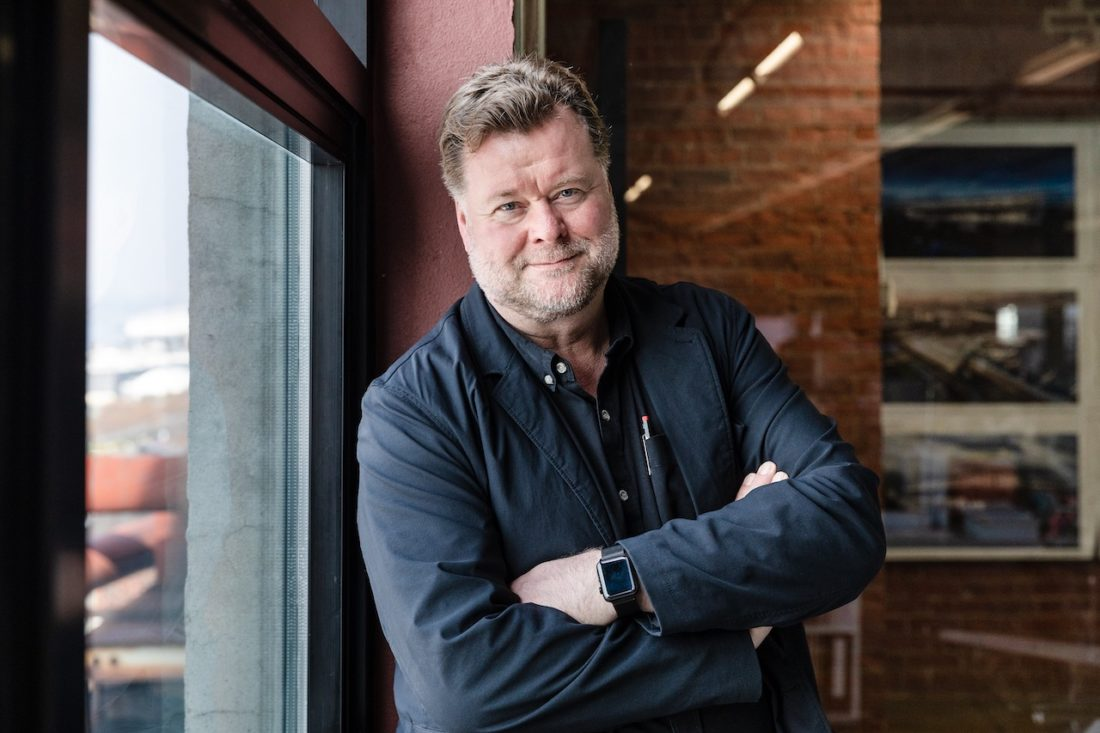
Andrew Whalley

Andrew David Whalley OBE is an architect registered in the United Kingdom and United States of America. His speciality is ecological design. In 2011, he was named Deputy Chairman of the international architecture firm Grimshaw Architects. He became chairman in 2019.

== Early life ==
Whalley was born in Elizabeth, South Australia, the son of an electronics engineer at the Woomera Test Range. At an early age, he moved to Connecticut, United States of America where his father worked on the UGM-27 Polaris Project. He moved to Dollar, Scotland in 1970 and was educated at Dollar Academy. His architectural education started at the Mackintosh School of Architecture, Glasgow, through 1983. He worked there while attending the Diploma School at The Architectural Association School of Architecture, London. He graduated in 1986.

== Career ==
Whalley joined Nicholas Grimshaw and Partners, now Grimshaw Architects, in 1986, immediately after completing his education. He worked with Jan Kaplicky on the firm's first exhibition and catalogue Practice Product and Process. The exhibition opened in January 1988 in the Florence Hall of the Royal Institute of British Architects and displayed large models and full size building components along with drawings and photographs. Shortly after the exhibition, the firm was selected to design the Waterloo International railway station, which was awarded both the Royal Institute of British Architects President's Building of the Year Award and the European Union Prize for Contemporary Architecture – Mies van der Rohe Award in 1994.

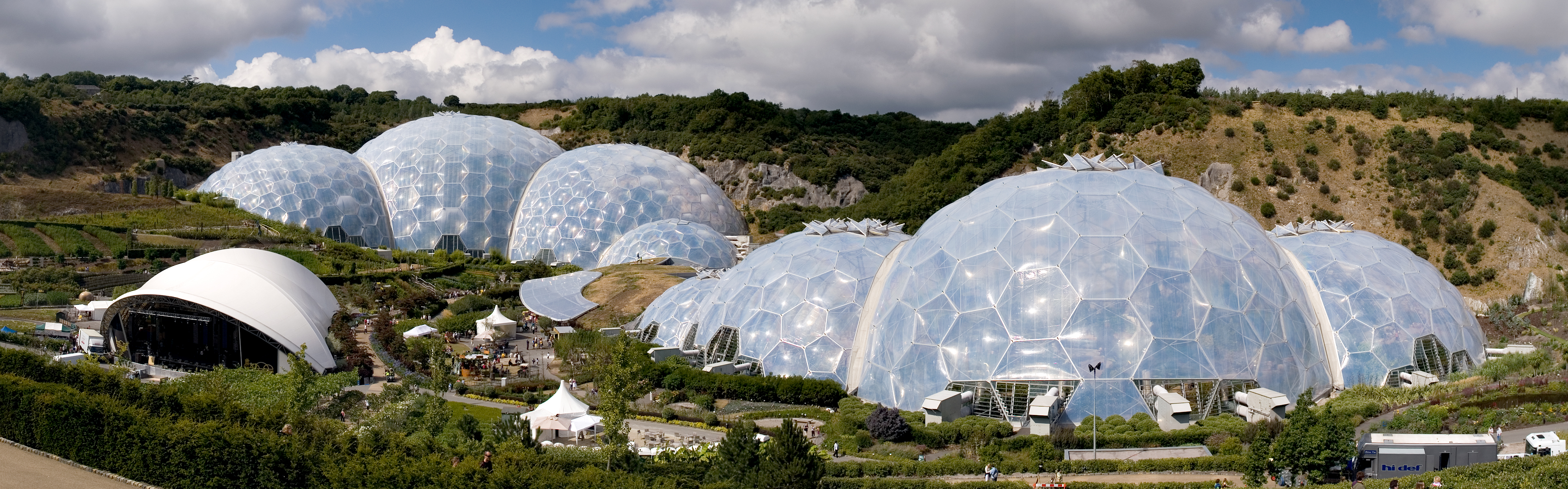
Panoramic view of the geodesic biome domes at the Eden Project

In 1990, Whalley, along with Fiona Galbraith and Chris McCarthy, designed a new type of roof structure which was featured in architectural magazines. It was included in their shortlisted entry in a contest for design of the Glasgow Eurodome, but was not the final selection.

He designed a house in Dollar, Scotland with Fiona Galbraith for his parents that won a Scottish RIBA Award for Architecture in 1990. He followed by designing a modern house again with Fiona Galbraith for their own use in London, completed 2005.

In 1996 he worked with Tim Smit and Jonathan Ball on a new Environmental Project that became The Eden Project in St Austell, Cornwall, UK. The first phase of the project, The Visitor Center opened to the public in 2000 and the Biomes opened in 2001. Andrew Whalley collaborated on a book with Sunday Times Architecture critic, Hugh Pearman, The Architecture of Eden, published by Transworld in 2003.

In 2001 he established the Grimshaw Architects office in New York and in the same year won the international design competition for the Experimental, Media and Performing Arts Center (EMPAC), New York. In 2003, they won a second competition for the new Fulton Center. During his ten years as Partner-in-Charge of the New York Office, Whalley established Grimshaw as one of the eight architectural practices selected for major public projects in New York under Mayor Bloomberg's design excellence program with the New York City Department of Design and Construction. Grimshaw was awarded the New York AIA Medal of Honor in 2014 for their commitment and contribution to the City Of New York.

In 2003, Whalley was a presenter at the "Performative Architecture: Instrumentality Plus?" symposium at the University of Pennsylvania.

Whalley was instrumental in Grimshaw's work on the Expo 2020 Sustainability Pavilion. For this project, Grimshaw assembled both a design team, underpinned by the engineering expertise of BuroHappold Engineering, as well as an Advisory Group Committee derived from some of the world's leading research institutions including NASA, California Academy of Sciences and Eden Project.

As well as building architecture, Whalley has also designed interiors and furniture.

He is a registered member of the AIA and RIBA and was elected as a Fellow of the Royal Society of Arts in 2006. In April 2019 he was elected to the board of the British Architectural Library Trust.

He was elected to the AIA College of Fellows for Design in 2019 and awarded an Honorary Doctorate of Letters from his alma mater, Glasgow School of Art.

Whalley was appointed Officer of the Order of the British Empire (OBE) in the 2022 New Year Honours for services to architecture and environmental sustainability.

== See also ==
- List of architects
- List of architecture firms
- Jan Kaplický – Taught Whalley at the Architectural Association School of Architecture
- Ron Herron – Taught Whalley at the Architectural Association School of Architecture
