= Almondsbury Interchange =

Junction of M4 and M5 motorways near Bristol, England

- Interactive map of Almondsbury Interchange

Location
- Almondsbury, South Gloucestershire
- Coordinates: 51°33′05″N 2°33′09″W
- Roads at junction: M4; M5

Construction
- Type: Stack interchange
- Constructed: 1964 by Richard Costain Ltd
- Opened: 8 September 1966
- Maintained by: National Highways

Location in Gloucestershire
Location in UK motorway network

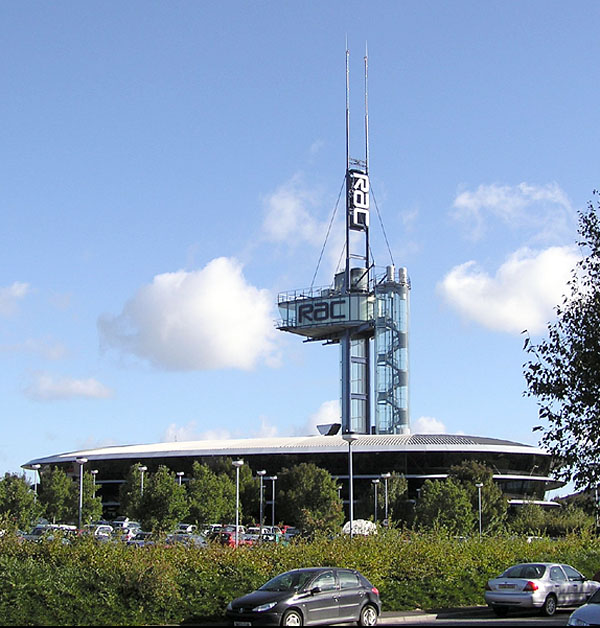
The RAC tower dominates the skyline at the Almondsbury Interchange

The Almondsbury Interchange in South Gloucestershire, is one of the United Kingdom's largest motorway stack interchanges. The interchange is one of only three four-level stacks in the UK, and including slip roads covers 1 square kilometre (0.39 sq mi). It is the interchange for the M5 at junction 15 and M4 at junction 20, and is situated at the northern fringes of Bristol close to the village of Almondsbury, the Aztec West industrial estate, and Bradley Stoke. When it opened in 1966, it was the most complex junction on the British motorway network, a free-flowing interchange on four levels. Since then traffic volumes have increased. At busy periods, the interchange becomes more difficult to negotiate safely. In an attempt to ease congestion, the Interchange has become part of a smart motorway.

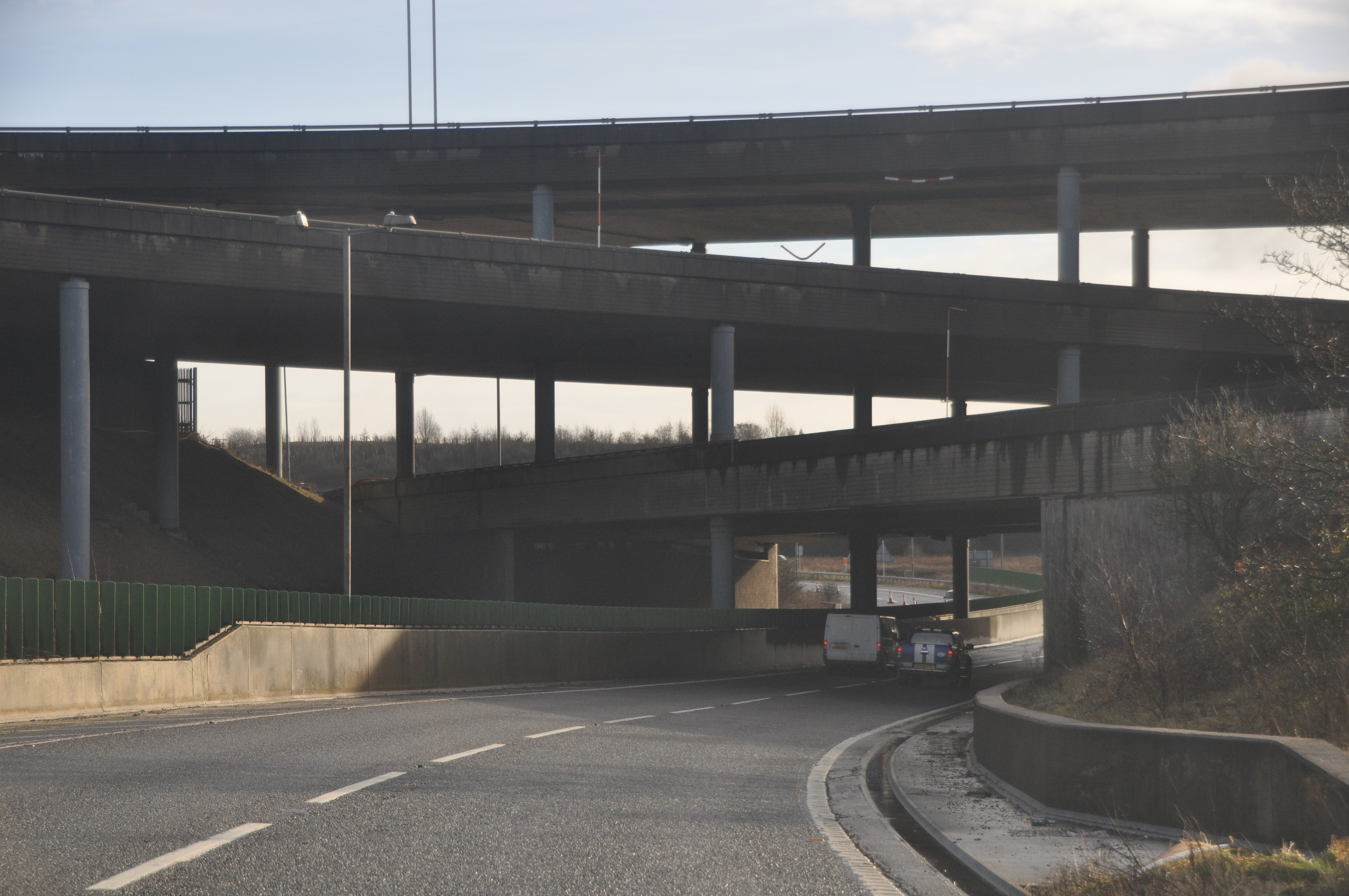
The Almondsbury Interchange from ground level

== The interchange ==
The Almondsbury Interchange is immediately adjacent to junction 16 of the M5, which allows traffic on and off the motorway from the A38 road running between Bristol and Gloucester. The slip roads from the A38 junction intertwine with those from the M5/M4 interchange. Unusually within the UK motorway system, this forces multiple lane changes for vehicles traversing some of the routes. The centres of the junctions are at Ordnance Survey Grid References ST 617837 (M5 J15/ Almondsbury Interchange) and ST 606833 (M5 J16/ A38), and are therefore 1.2 kilometres (0.75 mi) apart.

Almondsbury Interchange was the first four-level interchange in the United Kingdom. It was designed by Freeman Fox and Robert Earley. When it opened in 1966, it was the most complex junction on the British motorway network. The interchange was built by Richard Costain Ltd, with work commencing in May 1964. The bridge was opened by the Queen on 8 September 1966.

== Congestion ==
The interchange handles high volumes of traffic especially in the morning and evening rush hours. It is overlooked by the RAC Tower. Traffic travelling between the M5 and Second Severn Crossing can bypass the interchange by using the M49 motorway.

Under normal conditions, traffic flows freely through the interchange. Congestion becomes a problem in heavy traffic flow, such as during the summer holiday season, because of the close proximity of the A38 junction. This makes the required changing of lanes when travelling west on the M5 much more problematic.

The interchange is at the centre of a managed motorway project which covers junctions 19 to 20 on the M4 and 15 to 17 on the M5. This became fully operational in January 2014, after being installed over a two-year period. It involves the use of the hard shoulders on the M4 and M5 over seven miles of motorway during busy times, at which time a variable speed limit function is activated. Thirty-three new overhead gantries have been installed to advise motorists on the speed limits applicable at the time. The system is being enforced by speed cameras, and there are six emergency refuge areas for motorists who get into difficulties.
