= Grimshaw Architects =

British architecture firm founded by Nicholas Grimshaw

- Industry: Architecture
- Founded: London, United Kingdom; 1980; 46 years ago
- Number of locations: 7 Studios; Los Angeles; New York City; Paris; Dubai; Melbourne; Sydney
- Area served: Worldwide
- Key people: Nicholas Grimshaw (founder); Andrew Whalley (Chairman)
- Services: Architecture, Industrial Design
- Website: Grimshaw

Grimshaw Architects (formerly Nicholas Grimshaw & Partners) is an architectural firm based in London. Founded in 1980 by Nicholas Grimshaw, the firm was one of the pioneers of high-tech architecture. In particular, they are known for their design of transport projects including Amsterdam Bijlmer ArenA railway station, Waterloo International railway station and the award-winning Southern Cross railway station which was the recipient of the Royal Institute of British Architects Lubetkin Prize. Grimshaw is behind the design of the Sustainability Pavilion, an innovative net-zero building, for Expo 2020. The firm currently has offices in Los Angeles, New York, London, Paris, Dubai, Melbourne and Sydney, employing over 600 staff.

== Organisation ==
=== Partners ===
Grimshaw has 21 partners worldwide: Jolyon Brewis, Keith Brewis, Andrew Byrne, Vincent Chang, Andrew Cortese, Nicholas Grimshaw, William Horgan, Mark Husser, Michael Janeke, Ewan Jones, Annelie Kvick Thompson, Declan McCafferty, Neill McClements, Mark Middleton, Andrew Perez, Juan Porral, Neven Sidor, Neil Stonell, Andrew Thomas, and Andrew Whalley.

== Project list ==
Major projects, by year of completion and ordered by type, are:

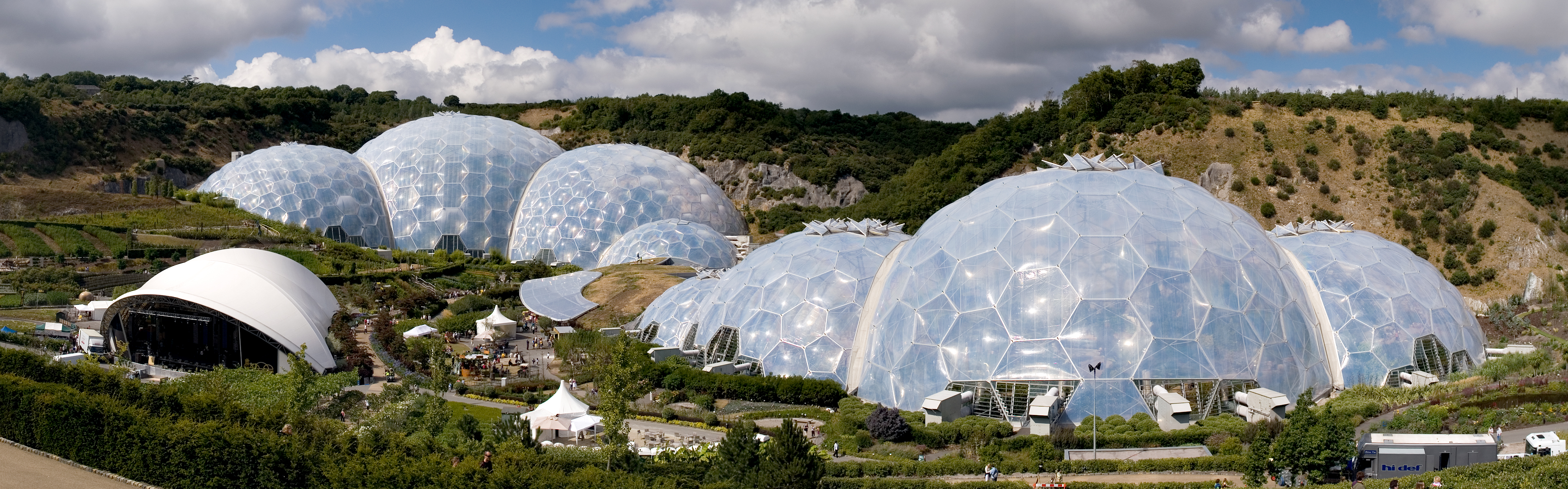
Panoramic view of the geodesic biome domes at the Eden Project

=== Arts and culture ===
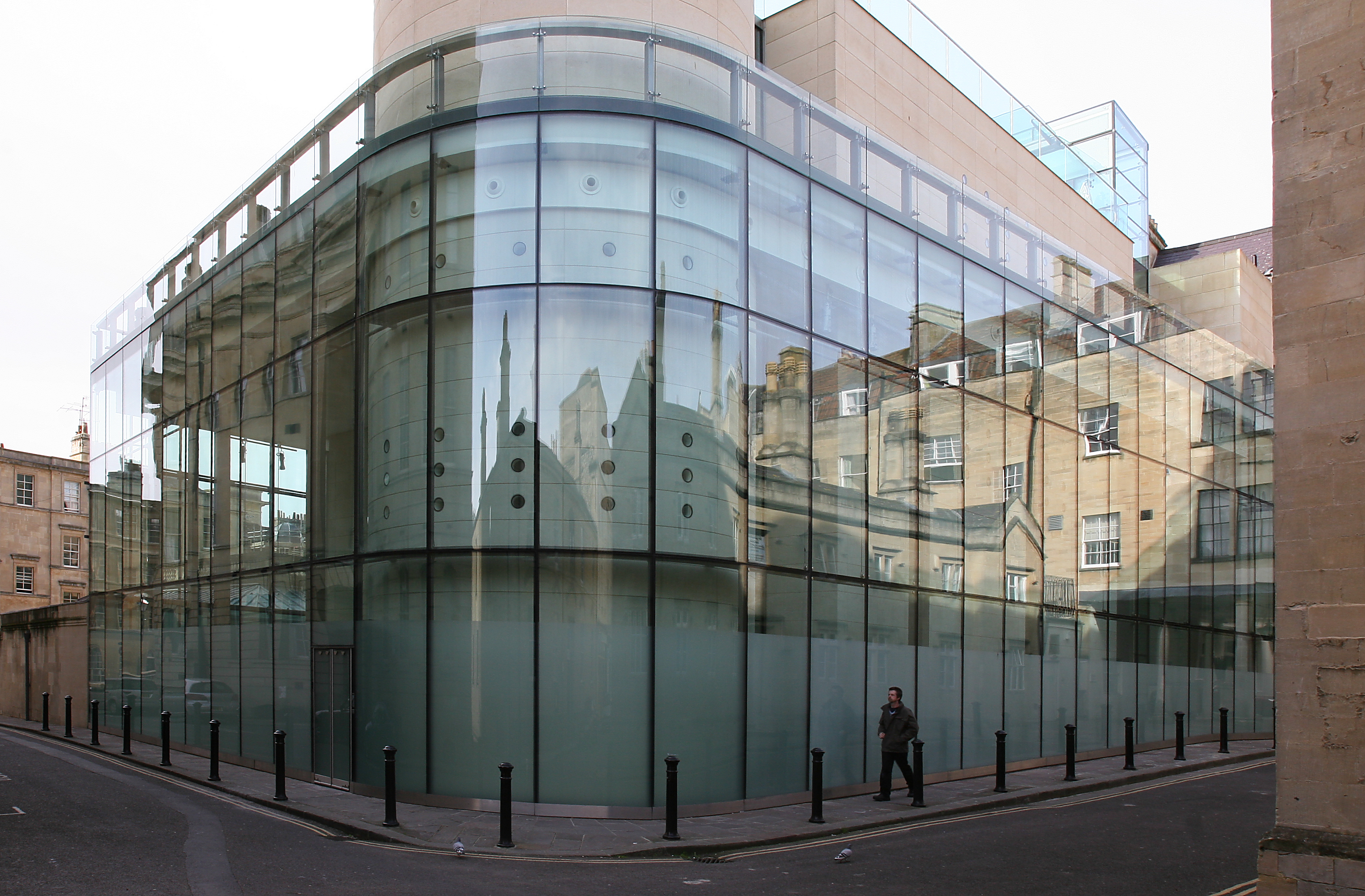
Thermae Bath Spa: the main building, 2006

- Oxford Ice Rink, Oxford, UK, 1984
- British Pavilion, Expo '92, Seville, Spain, 1992
- Eden Project, Cornwall, UK, 2001
- National Space Centre, Leicester, UK, 2001
- Caixa Galicia Art Foundation, A Coruña, Spain, 2006
- Thermae Bath Spa, Bath, 2006
- Horno 3: Museo del Acero, Museum of Steel, Monterrey, Mexico, 2007
- Experimental Media and Performing Arts Center (EMPAC), Troy, US, 2008
- Mobilizarte Mobile Pavilion, Brazil, 2012
- Queens Museum of Art, Queens, 2013
- Phillip and Patricia Frost Museum of Science, Miami, US 2014
- Shanghai Disney Resort Tomorrowland, Shanghai, China, 2016
- Arter (art center) Contemporary Art Museum, Istanbul, Turkey, 2019
- Sustainability Pavilion, Expo 2020 Dubai, 2020

=== Bridges ===
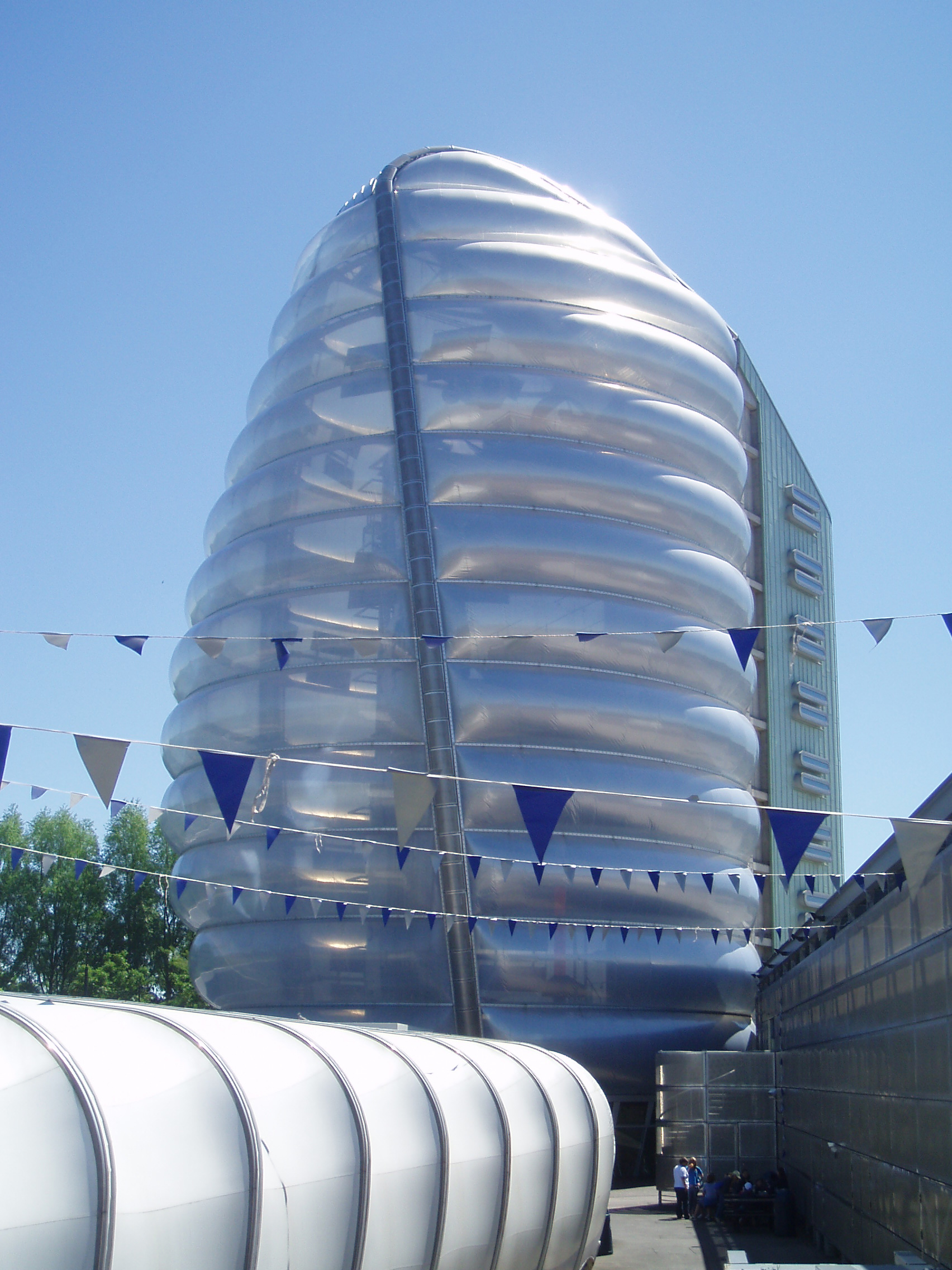
The National Space Centre in Leicester

- IJburg Bridge, Amsterdam, the Netherlands, 2001
- Newport City footbridge, Newport, South Wales, 2006
- Seafarers Bridge, Melbourne, Australia, 2008
- A40 Western Avenue Footbridge, London, UK, 2009
- Neville Bonner Bridge, Brisbane, Australia, 2024

=== Science and education ===
- Eden Project: The Core, Cornwall, UK, 2005
- University College London: Roberts Building Front Extension, London, UK, 2007
- University College London Cancer Institute: Paul O Gorman Building, London, UK, 2007
- London School of Economics: New Academic Building, London, UK, 2009
- London South Bank University, London, UK, 2010
- New York University Polytechnic: Rogers Hall, Brooklyn, US, 2011
- Doherty Institute, Melbourne, Australia, 2014
- Boldrewood Innovation Campus Phase 1, Southampton, UK, 2015
- University of New South Wales Hilmer Building, Sydney, Australia, 2015
- Bangor University Arts and Innovation Centre, Bangor, UK, 2016
- Dulwich College Laboratory, London, UK, 2016
- Duke University, The Richard H. Brodhead Center for Campus Life, Durham, NC, USA, 2016

=== Rail ===
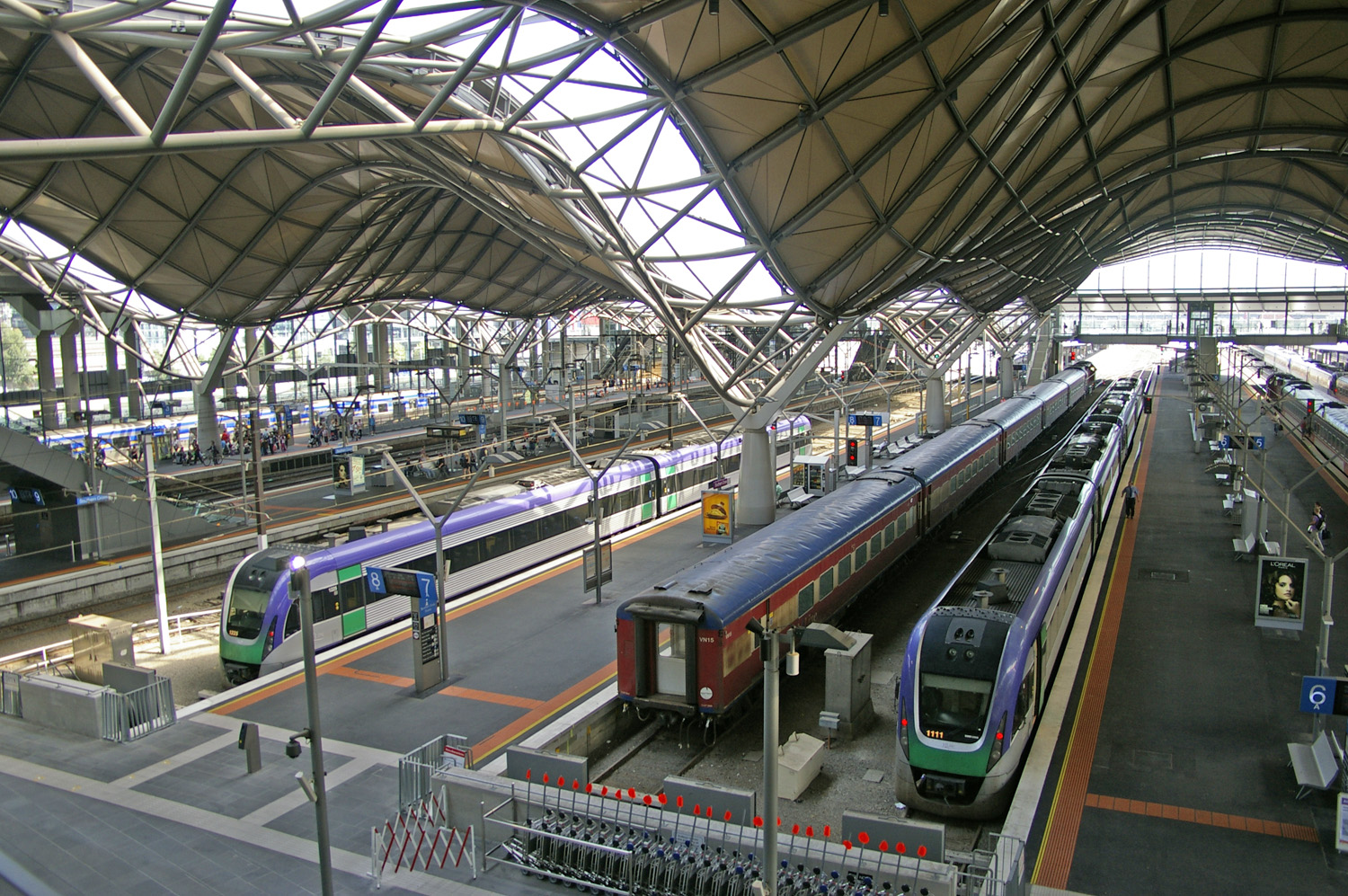
Southern Cross Station

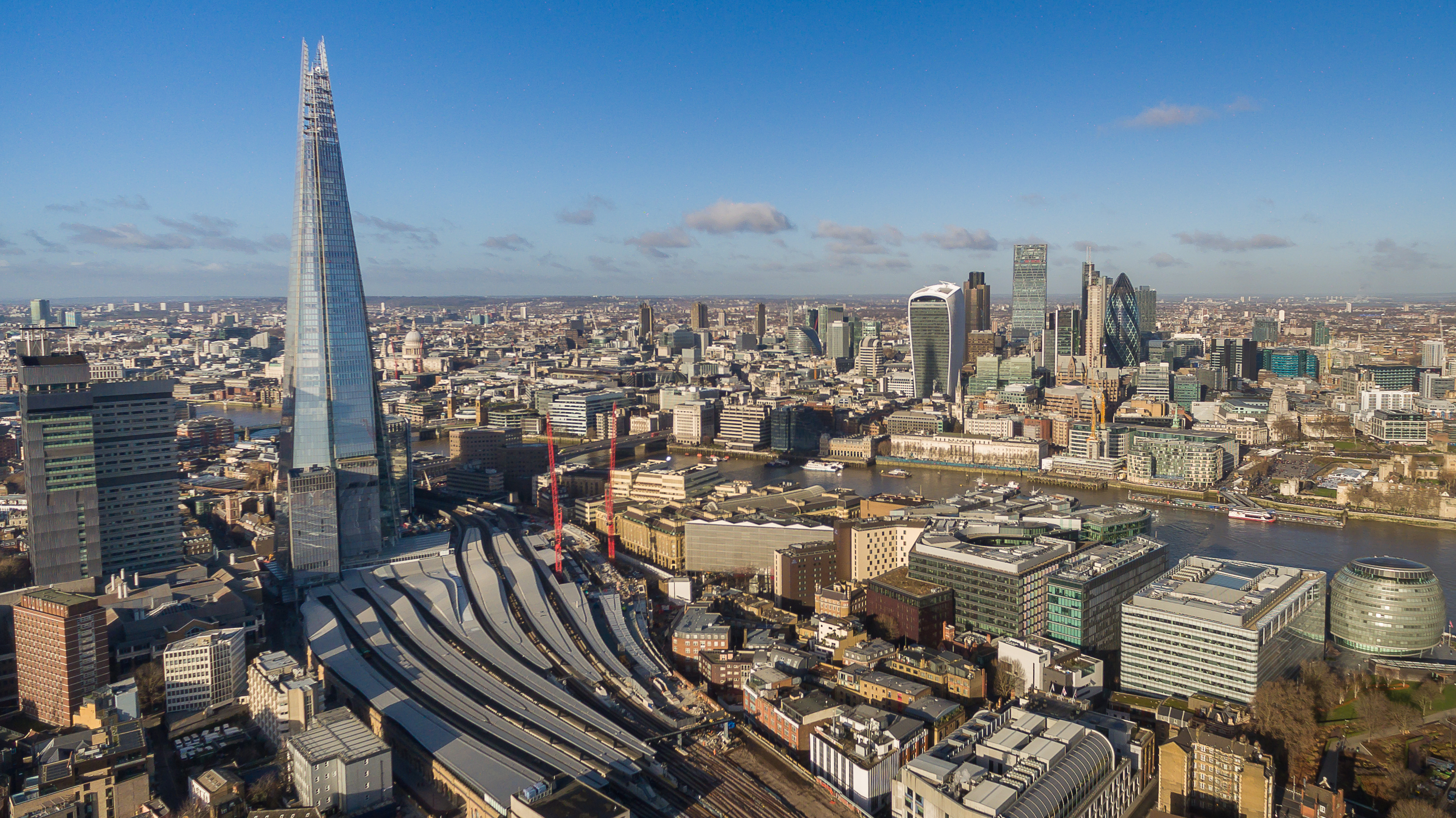
London Bridge Station

- International Terminal, Waterloo Station, London, UK, 1993
- Paddington Station, London, UK, 1999
- Southern Cross railway station, Melbourne, Australia, 2006
- Amsterdam Bijlmer ArenA Station, Amsterdam, Netherlands, 2007
- Nunawading railway station, Melbourne, Australia, 2010
- Fulton Center, Manhattan, US, 2014
- Reading railway station, Reading, UK, 2014
- London Bridge station, London, UK, 2018
- LAX/Metro Transit Center, Los Angeles, USA, 2025
- Mernda railway line Extension, Melbourne, Australia, 2018
- Vaughan Metropolitan Centre station, Vaughan, Canada, 2018
- Sydney CBD and South East Light Rail, Sydney, Australia, 2019

=== Aviation ===
- Heathrow Airport Terminal 1, Pier 4A, UK, 1993
- Manchester Airport Terminal 3, UK, 1998
- Zurich Airport, Zurich, Switzerland, 2004
- Heathrow Airport Terminal 2B, UK, 2009
- Pulkovo Airport, St. Petersburg, Russia, 2013
- Istanbul Airport Turkey, 2019
- Newark Liberty International New Terminal A, Newark, USA, 2022

=== Office and workplace ===
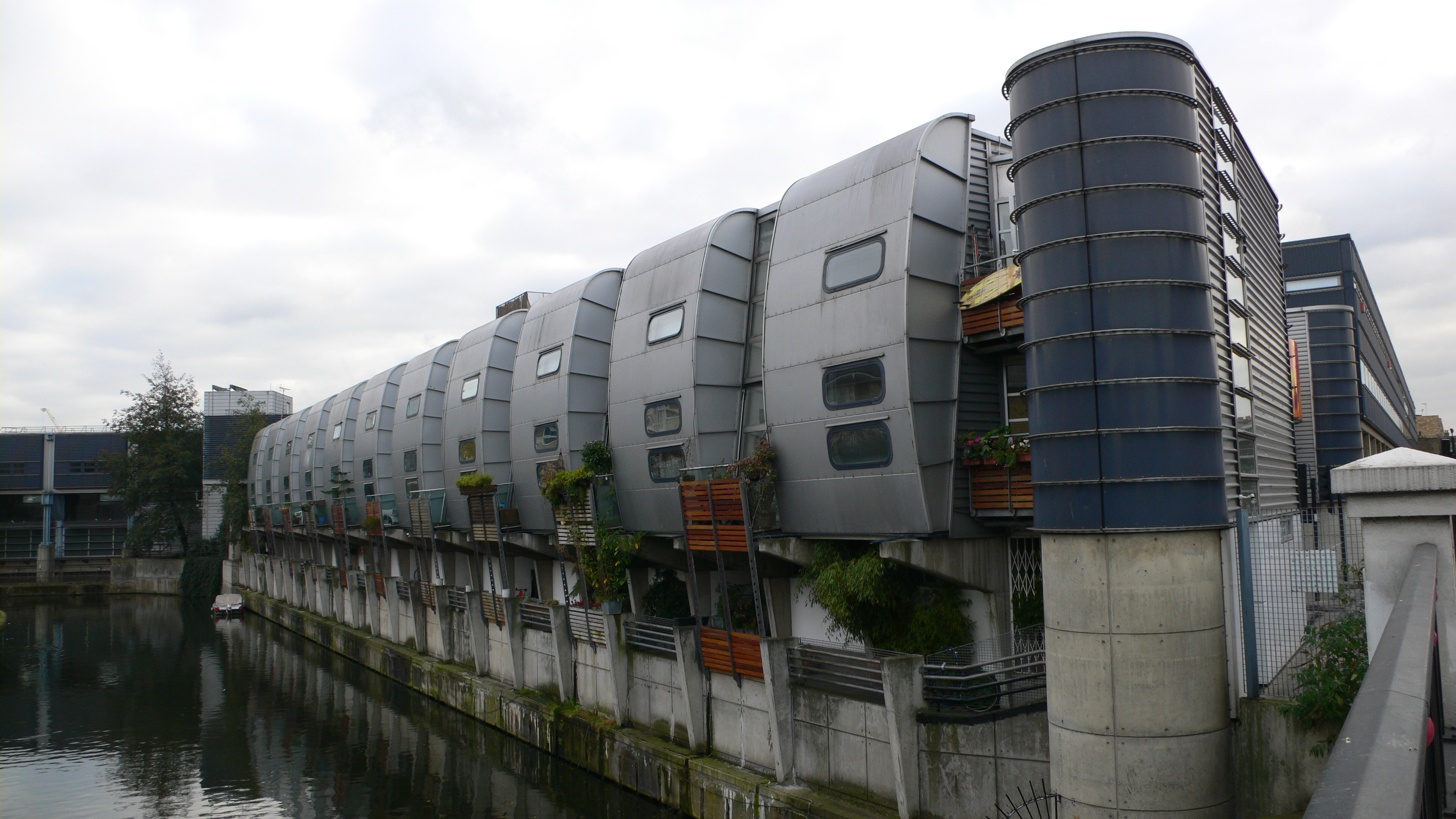
Grand Union Walk Housing – Flats behind Sainsbury's supermarket, Camden Town, 1988

- British Airways Operations, London, UK, 1993
- RAC Regional Control Centre, Bristol, UK, 1994
- Ludwig Erhaud Haus, Berlin, Germany, 1998
- Orange Operational Centre and Customer Service Facilities, Darlington, UK, 1998
- 25 Gresham Street, London, UK, 2002
- Eden Project: The Foundation, Cornwall, UK, 2002
- Five Boats Houding, Duisburg, Germany, 2005
- 385 Bourke Street, Melbourne, Australia, 2008
- The St Botolphs Building, London, UK, 2010
- John Lewis & Partners Fashion Pavilion, London, UK, 2011
- Highpoint Shopping Centre, Melbourne, Australia, 2013
- 699 Bourke Street, Melbourne, Australia, 2015
- 333 George Street, Sydney, Australia, 2016
- YOOX Net-a-Porter Group Tech Hub, London, UK, 2017
- Plexal Innovation Centre, London, UK, 2017
- Belfast City Quays 2, Belfast, Northern Ireland, 2018
- 664 Collins Street, Melbourne, Australia, 2018
- 50/60 Station Road, Cambridge, UK, 2019
- Olderfleet, Melbourne, Australia, 2020

=== Industry ===
- Herman Miller Factory, Bath, Somerset, UK, 1976
- Vitra Furniture Factory, Weil am Rhein, Germany, 1981
- Herman Miller Factory, Chippenham, UK, 1982
- Financial Times Printworks, London, UK, 1988
- Western Morning News, Plymouth, UK, 1993
- Igus Factory & Headquarters, Cologne, Germany, 2000
- Donald Danforth Plant Center, St. Louis, US, 2001
- Rolls-Royce Motor Cars Manufacturing Plant & Headquarters, West Sussex, UK, 2003
- Suez Environnement Energy from Waste Facility, Suffolk, UK, 2014
- Herman Miller (manufacturer) Portal Mill, Melksham, UK, 2015

=== Mixed use and housing ===
- Sainsbury's Store & Grand Union Walk Housing, London, UK, 1988
- Via Verde – The Green Way, The Bronx, US, 2012
- Harbour Mill Apartments, Sydney, Australia, 2015

== Awards ==
=== 2019 ===
- Royal Institute of British Architects (RIBA) Royal Gold Medal for Architecture awarded to Nicholas Grimshaw
- AJ 100: Practice of the Year
- AIANY + ASLANY Transportation + Infrastructure Design Excellence Awards—Vaughan Metropolitan Centre station
- SCUP Outstanding Achievement in Integrated Planning and Design—Duke University Brodhead Center

=== 2018 ===
- SCUP Excellence in Landscape Architecture (General Design)—Duke University Brodhead Center
- World Architecture Festival 'Transport- Completed Buildings' Category Winner—London Bridge station Redevelopment
- British Constructional Steelwork Association's Structural Steel Design Award—London Bridge station Redevelopment
- British Construction Industry Awards (BCIA), Transport Project of the Year, ICE200 Award—London Bridge station Redevelopment
- British Transport Awards, Station of the Year— London Bridge station Redevelopment
- City of Sydney Lord Mayor's Prize, NSW AIA Awards, Commendation—333 George Street
- NSW AIA Award, Commendation—333 George Street Interior fit-out
- Chicago Athenaeum Award—333 George Street
- Design Impact Awards, Australian Interior Design Awards—Highpoint Shopping Centre
- AJ 100: International Practice of the Year
- New London Awards, Overall Prize—London Bridge station Redevelopment
- New London Awards, Transport and Infrastructure—London Bridge station Redevelopment
- New London Awards, Sustainability Prize—London Bridge station Redevelopment
- RSAW Welsh Architecture Awards—Bangor University, Arts and Innovation Centre

=== 2017 ===
- Civic Trust Awards– SUEZ Energy-from-Waste
- Civic Trust Awards– Southampton Boldrewood Phase 1
- RIBA National Award– The Laboratory, Dulwich College
- ICE 'Greatest Contribution to London'– London Bridge station Redevelopment
- AJ Retrofit Awards International Retrofit Project– Duke University Brodhead Center
- ENR Southeast Best Cultural Project– Phillip and Patricia Frost Museum of Science
- ENR Southeast Higher Education/Research Award of Merit– Duke University Brodhead Center

=== 2016 ===
- Commonwealth Institute of Architects; Robert Matthew Awards
- AJ 100: International Practice of the Year

=== 2015 ===
- AIA New York COTE Award – Via Verde (designed with Dattner Architects)
- AIA New York: Medal of Honor
- AJ 120: Project of the Year—Fulton Center
- BCI Award: International Project of the Year—Fulton Center

=== 2014 ===
- MASterworks Award: Best Adaptive Reuse—Queens Museum

=== 2013 ===
- Royal Institute of British Architects (RIBA) International Award— Via Verde
- 2013 AIA Housing and Urban Development Secretary's Award— Via Verde
- AIA New York State Award of Excellence— Via Verde

=== 2012 ===
- Carbuncle Cup – Building Design Awards

=== 2009 ===
- AIA Honor Award – Horno 3: Museo Del Acero

=== 2008 ===
- Architectural Practice of the Year – Building Design Awards
- World Architect of the Year – Building Design Awards
- Transport Architect of the Year – Building Design Awards
- 2008 RIBA European Award – Amsterdam Bijlmer ArenA Station
- Royal Institute of Dutch Architects – Amsterdam Bijlmer ArenA Station
- Stirling Prize Runner up – Amsterdam Bijlmer ArenA Station

=== 2007 ===
- Lubetkin Prize – Southern Cross Station, Melbourne, Australia
- 2007 RIBA International Award – Southern Cross Station, Melbourne, Australia

== Controversy ==
In October 2019, UK publications Construction News and Architects' Journal published a joint investigation into fatalities at Istanbul Airport - nicknamed by workers "the cemetery" as so many have died. By this point, the official death toll was 55, but unofficial estimates suggested the figure could "be higher than 400". Grimshaw was one of four architects employed on the airport's design, three of them UK-based (the other two were Scott Brownrigg and Haptic Architects). As concept architects, Grimshaw ceased working on the project before the construction phase, and voiced shock and sadness about what it described as the "alarmingly high number" of subsequent deaths.

== Exhibitions ==
Grimshaw's first exhibition titled Product + Process debuted in 1988. The firm has since produced four exhibitions: Structure Space + Skin (1993), Fusion (1998), Equilibrium (2000), and Micro to Macro: Grimshaw in New York (2007). The latest exhibition, Equation: Design Inspired by Nature, launched on Wednesday, 20 February 2013 at The Urban Redevelopment Authority (URA) Centre in Singapore. Equation explores a series of themes that investigate biomimicry, biophilia and ecosystems and their influence on design.

== Publications ==
- Grimshaw Architecture: The First Thirty Years
- Blue 02: Systems and Structure
- Blue 01: Water, Energy and Waste
- The Sketchbooks of Nicholas Grimshaw
- The Making of Station Amsterdam Bijlmer ArenA
- The Architecture of Eden
- Equilibrium
- Grimshaw: Architecture, Industry and Innovation
- Structure, Space and Skin: The Work of Nicholas Grimshaw & Partners
- British Pavilion Seville Exposition

== See also ==
- Nicholas Grimshaw buildings and structures
- List of architecture firms
- List of architects
