= Edinburgh University Students' Association =

Students' union in Edinburgh, Scotland

Coordinates: 55°56′42.4″N 3°11′19.1″W

- Institution: University of Edinburgh
- Location: The Potterrow, Bristo Square, Edinburgh, Scotland, United Kingdom
- Established: 1884 – Students' Representative Council 1889 – Edinburgh University Union; 1905 – Edinburgh University Women's Union 1931 – King’s Buildings Union
- President: Ash Scholz
- CEO: Stephen Hubbard
- Vice presidents: John Rappa (Activities & Services) Ruth Elliott (Community); Dylan Walch (Education); Indigo Williams (Welfare) (2024/25)
- Members: c. 49,500
- Affiliations: National Union of Students National Campaign Against Fees and Cuts; Right to Education Campaign/Friends of Birzeit University; Stop Climate Chaos Scotland; Votes at 16 As of 2025
- Income: £4.1m (2023/24)
- Website: www.eusa.ed.ac.uk

Edinburgh University Students' Association (EUSA) is the students' union at the University of Edinburgh, Scotland. The Association's aim is the advancement of education of Edinburgh students by representing and supporting them, and by promoting their interests, health and welfare within the community. It is led by a team of five elected student sabbatical officers.

Due to the evolution of student unionism at Edinburgh, student sports are not part of the main university union, and are overseen by a separate organisation, Edinburgh University Sports Union (EUSU), which has its own representative and organisational structure. EUSU works closely with the university's Centre for Sport and Exercise.

Ash Scholz is the current President and was elected in March 2025.

== History ==
=== 1884–1972: Establishment ===
An Edinburgh students' representative council (SRC) was founded in 1884 by student Robert Fitzroy Bell, bringing together students from the university's clubs & societies. Shortly afterwards, the SRC voted to establish a union (the Edinburgh University Union (EUU)), to provide social space and recreational facilities for students. The SRC established a campaign of public fundraising, with prominent figures in the city and the general public donating £5,000, and a fancy fair held at the Waverly Market raised £10,000. The Town Council and Senatus Academicus donated £100 and £500 respectively to the cause. This £15,600 (£2,000,000 in 2019 money) was used to hire an architect, Sydney Mitchell, and begin construction of the Union building adjacent to the Medical School and the Reid Concert Hall. Teviot Row House was officially opened on 19 October 1889, and is the oldest purpose-built student union in the world. EUU was constituted as an autonomous organisation, and did not admit women until 1971.

The Edinburgh University Women's Union was founded in October 1905, later moving to premises at 16 Chambers Street and renaming itself to the Chambers Street Union in 1964. The King's Buildings Union was established in 1931 in huts formerly used by the Geology department, before moving into a custom building in 1939.

=== 1970–2000: Merger ===
On 1 July 1973 the SRC, the EUU and the Chambers Street Union merged to form Edinburgh University Students' Association. Due to reference in the Universities (Scotland) Act 1889, the SRC could not be dissolved at the time of merger. Through the SRC, EUSA is the oldest students' union in the UK. In 1994 the university forced the merger of the King's Buildings Union and EUSA, although the members of KB Union voted against the proposed merger.

Due to the university merging with other organisations, since 1994, EUSA has merged with the Moray House Institute of Education Union and the Edinburgh College of Art Union.

In 1976 EUSA disaffiliated from the National Union of Students (NUS), a decision that was reversed in 2004. In 2005 EUSA formally twinned with Birzeit University Student Council, West Bank, with each union hosting delegations from the other.

=== 2000–present ===
Following a student consultation process and a referendum in February 2012 a new constitution was established in 2011 and amended in 2013. This took full effect in 2014, incorporating the Association as a charitable company limited by guarantee. This constitution also had the effect of changing some democratic processes, including establishing the board of trustees in its current form.

In 2016 EUSA became the first students union in the UK to affiliate to Students for Cooperation as an affiliated supporter in order to promote and support student-led cooperatives. EUSA submitted a proposal to NUS Scotland for affiliation with Students for Cooperation, which was accepted.

EUSA's logo until September 2016

Also in 2016, EUSA sabbatical officers and management submitted a referendum to the student membership over whether to change the Association's name to "University of Edinburgh Students' Union", alongside a number of internal administrative changes. The name change was rejected by 69.9% of students. EUSA then embarked on a major rebranding programme, changing the logo and encouraging the organisation to be referred to as "the Association", or "your Students' Association" instead of "EUSA".

=== Controversy ===
EUSA was criticised in 2013 after acting using the Court of Session to "censor" The Student as it "was due to publish details of the suspension of Max Crema, vice-president of services at the union". President James McAsh defended the action, claiming it was taken "to protect the rights of our employees".

In 2013, EUSA made the decision to ban the playing of "Blurred Lines" by Robin Thicke in its venues, attracting some attention in national media. The song was deemed to promote "an unhealthy attitude towards sex and consent", and for being in breach of EUSA's 'End Rape Culture and Lad Banter on Campus' policy, designed to tackle 'myths and stereotypes around sexual violence' and stop the sexual objectification of female students.

In 2014, EUSA was threatened with legal proceedings by the National Secretary of the Socialist Workers Party (SWP), Charlie Kimber, following a motion put forward banning the SWP from the Edinburgh campus due to the 'Comrade Delta' rape scandal. EUSA eventually withdrew the motion. This also resulted in the editors of The Student newspaper, an EUSA society, manually ripping pages out of their own newspapers to avoid personal legal liability, as the story about the motion had already been printed before it was withdrawn.

== Activities ==
EUSA's activities include representing and campaigning on behalf of students, the administration of societies, running a network of bars and other venues, organising volunteering opportunities and providing numerous welfare and advice services. EUSA also directly organises regular events such as Freshers' Week, club nights, pub quizzes, band nights, various comedy events, and the Graduation Ball.

=== Campaigning ===
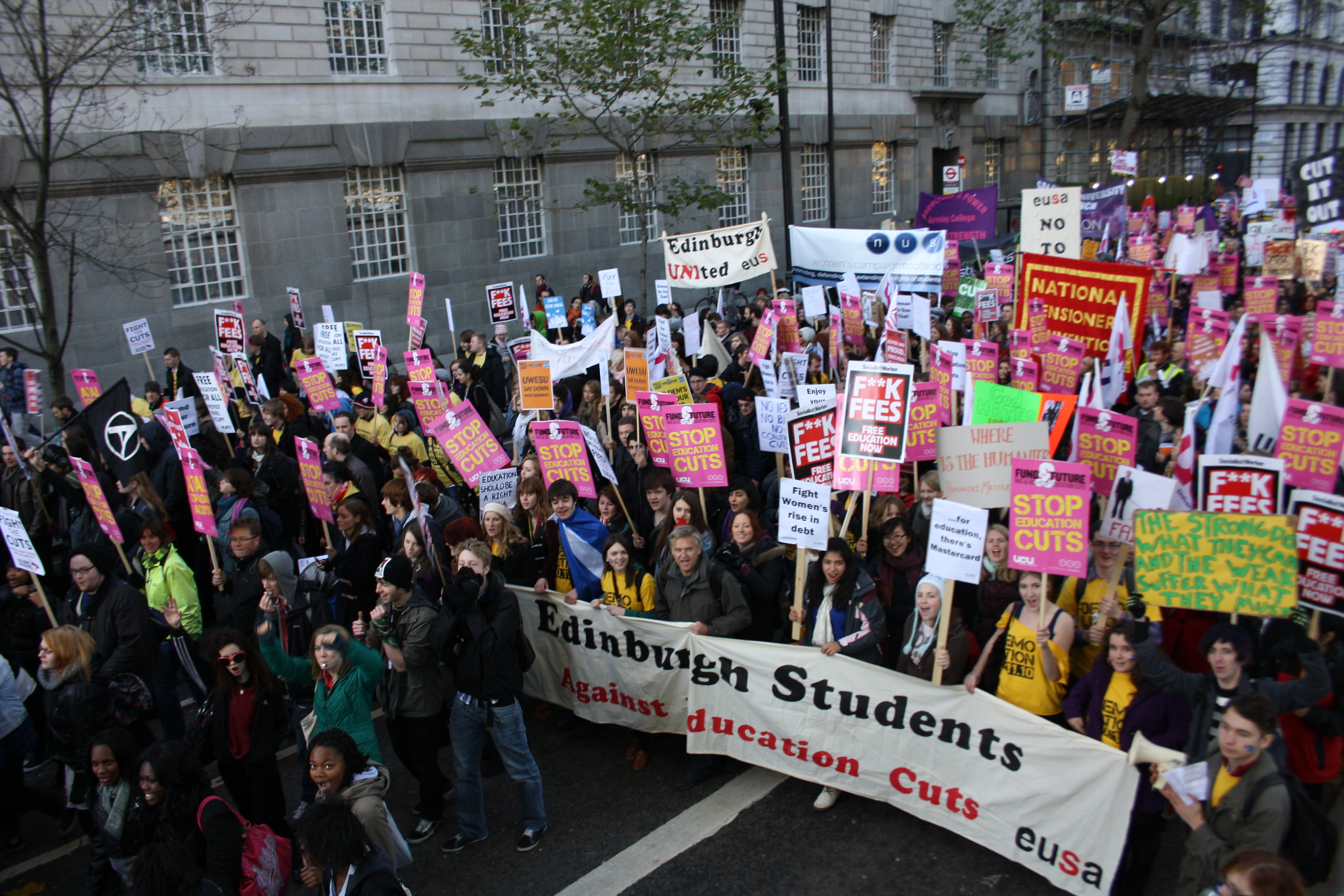
Edinburgh students protest in London against fee rises

Since 2010, EUSA has supported campaigns for same-sex marriage, against tuition fee rises and education cuts, and for better private tenancy rights; EUSA also lobbies the university on internal issues, such as on-campus child care. It has also had a significant role in the overhaul of the university's student support structure, and in making Edinburgh Scotland's first Fairtrade University in 2004. In 2007, following several years of pressure from EUSA, the University Senate revoked Robert Mugabe's honorary degree that had been awarded in 1984 "for services to education in Africa".

=== Societies ===
EUSA supports and oversees over 280 affiliated societies. There are societies for most academic disciplines, political parties, nationalities and minority groups. Its oldest society, The Diagnostic Society of Edinburgh pre-dates the SRC but is currently merged under EUSA whilst still retaining general operative independence.

Student theatre at Edinburgh is particularly active. The Edinburgh University Theatre Company (EUTC) was founded in 1896 as the Edinburgh University Drama Society, and since the early 1980s has run Bedlam Theatre, the oldest student-run theatre in Britain, and The Improverts, the city's longest-running improvised comedy troupe. Edinburgh University Footlights and Edinburgh University Savoy Opera Group (EUSOG) are musical theatre societies, the latter having an emphasis towards the Savoy operas of Gilbert and Sullivan. Theatre Paradok are dedicated to experimental theatre.

Music is a large part of EUSA's output. The Edinburgh University Music Society founded in 1867 is the second oldest music society in the United Kingdom. With a Symphonic Chorus of up to 200 members, a full size Symphony Orchestra and Sinfonia, EUMS performs up to seven concerts a year in the university. The university is also home to the Edinburgh University Renaissance Singers conducted by University Lecturer Dr Paul Newton-Jackson.

Media-themed societies include The Student (Edinburgh's own student newspaper), Fresh Air (a student radio station, online-only since 2008), the Edinburgh Movie Production Society (EMPS), the Edinburgh Film Society and most recently EUTV, Edinburgh University Television Station.

Charitable and campaigning societies are numerous, including Edinburgh Global Partnerships and the Edinburgh branches of the Nightline support hotline and People & Planet charitable network.

LGBT+ Pride is represented by five EUSA groups: LGBT+ Medics, LGBTQ+ Campaign, LGBTQ+ Law Society, LGBTQ+ Peer Mentoring, and PrideSoc.

=== Buildings, venues and outlets ===
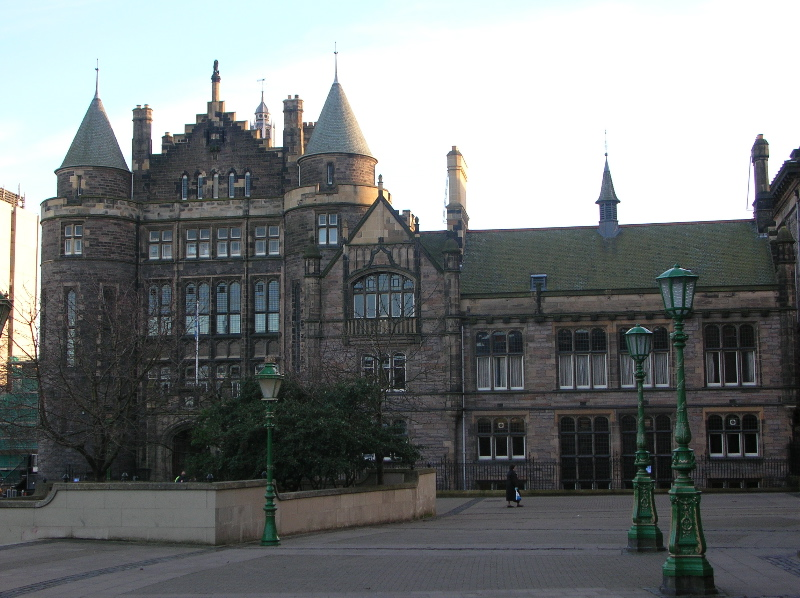
Teviot Row House as seen from Bristo Square

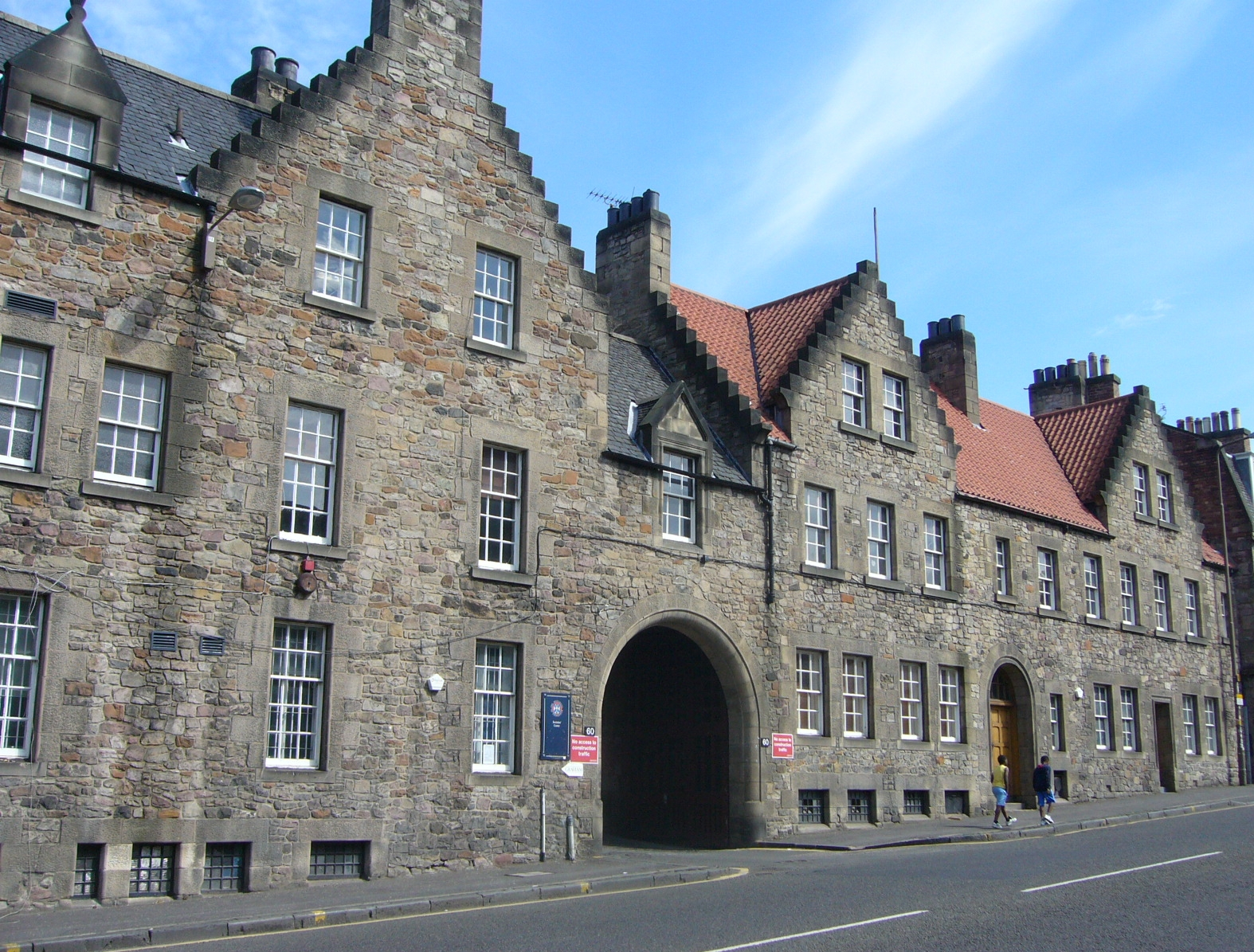
The Pleasance

EUSA operates 13 bars, 7 catering outlets, 5 shops, a catering company (Honours Catering) and numerous other services located across various sites. Most of these buildings are operated as Edinburgh Fringe venues during August.

- Teviot Row House is the largest EUSA building and the oldest purpose built student union building in the world. Located on Bristo Square, Teviot contains six bars (The Library Bar, The Sports Bar, The New Amphion, The Lounge Bar (informally known as The Jazz Bar), Teviot Underground and The Loft Bar), a small nightclub (Teviot Underground) and a variety of meeting rooms and halls. Following a fire at Gilded Balloon's Grassmarket venue, Teviot is now their primary base during the Fringe.
- The Pleasance provides EUSA societies with meeting space during semesters. It also has two bars and a theatre with an approximate capacity of 300. It is located next to the university's Centre for Sport and Exercise. During the Fringe, The Pleasance is run by the Pleasance Theatre Trust Ltd as the "Pleasance Courtyard".
- Potterrow, is also located on Bristo Square. With its distinctive dome, this building includes two shops, two cafes, a 1200 capacity nightclub, the Activities Office, a student support centre (The Advice Place) and EUSA's main administrative offices. Potterrow is also run by the Pleasance Theatre Trust during the Fringe, along with many other Fringe venues, and is branded as the "Pleasance Dome".
- King's Buildings is the home of most of the College of Science and Engineering, located in the south of the city. King's Buildings House includes a bar and food outlet, a small gym, a branch of the Advice Place and a small shop. The Magnet Cafe is located in the James Clerk Maxwell Building, and there is another shop on the ground floor of the KB Centre.
- Pollock Shop is a late opening shop in Pollock Halls.
- The Peffermill Clubhouse is a bar located at the university playing fields at Peffermill.

== Structure ==
EUSA is a democratic membership organisation, a charitable body and a company limited by guarantee, ultimately overseen by a Board of Trustees.

All Edinburgh University students automatically become members of EUSA upon matriculation, though they retain the ability to opt out as per the Education Act 1994.

The Association's day-to-day student leadership is provided by a team of five full-time elected students, the Sabbatical Officers, currently:

- President – responsible for the overall functioning and external politics of the association;
- Vice President Activities and Services (VPAS) – responsible for activities in relation to student societies and representation to the university and Students' Association on non-academic service provision;
- Vice President Community (VPC) – responsible for lobbying the university for affordable transport and housing, as well as campaigning on sustainability and community engagement
- Vice President Education (VPE) – responsible for representing students to the university and beyond on HE and academic matters
- Vice President Welfare (VPW) – responsible for representing students to the university and beyond on student welfare

Democracy is primarily provided through an open Student Council, which holds elected Officers to account, and creates policy. The Student Council meets in Teviot Row House on the last Thursday in each month during term-time.

Elections are held twice a year, the Spring election and the Postgraduate election in Autumn. The Sabbatical Officers, School Representatives, Section Representatives, Activities Representatives and Liberation Officers are elected in the Spring Elections in an online ballot. Postgraduate positions and any positions not filled in the Spring election are elected in the Postgraduate elections, also held via an online ballot and open to all members of the Association.

These elected representatives form a number of bodies that work throughout the year. The Activities Executive makes decisions relating specifically to student societies, composed of the Vice President (Activities & Services) and activities representatives elected to represent a specific society category. There are a series of open liberation groups (Black Minority and Ethnic, Disabled Students, LGBT, and Women) and student section groups (International, Mature, Carers, Parents, Postgraduate Taught, Postgraduate Research, and Part-Time).

Elected representatives also sit on all major University bodies and subcommittees. Complementing these structures are autonomous school councils and a class representation system providing local, democratic spaces for organising. This organisational structure was designed to help foster a system of participatory democracy throughout the university.

EUSA's financial, legal and employment matters are the responsibility of the Chief Executive and a senior management team, who report to and are held accountable by a Board of Trustees, which currently consists of:

- The five Sabbatical officers
- Four student trustees, appointed by the sabbatical trustees for two years.
- Three external trustees, appointed by the student trustees for no more than three years.

Each Trustee may serve a maximum of two terms. Sabbatical officers must be re-elected to office, and Elected or Student Trustees may serve a second term with approval of the board of trustees.

EUSA has a fully owned subsidiary company, EUSACO, incorporating any activity which is outside EUSA's charitable remit, such as the Edinburgh Fringe and external catering activities. Responsibility for EUSA's commercial services is delegated by the board of trustees to the Strategic Development Subcommittee.

== Notable people ==
This is an incomplete list of notable former office bearers, staff and others with EUSA and its predecessor unions.

- Gordon Aikman – Motor Neurone Disease campaigner and former Director of Research at Better Together, EUSA Vice President Societies & Activities (2007–2008).
- Robert Fitzroy Bell – Publisher and advocate, founder of the SRC and SRC President (1884)
- Andrew Brown – Broadcaster and brother of Gordon Brown, EUSA Senior President (1975–1976).
- Gordon Brown – EUSA member 1972-75. Elected Rector of the University of Edinburgh in 1972 while still a student, serving until 1975.
- Donald Brydon CBE – Chairman of Royal Mail and Medical Research Council, EUU President (1967–1968).
- Herbert Bullmore – Rugby player and physician, EUU President (1901–1902)
- Robert Cochrane Buist – Obstetrician and gynaecologist, SRC President
- Maggie Chapman MSP – Scottish Green Party politician, EUSA Postgraduate Convener.
- Susan Deacon – Former Labour MSP for Edinburgh East & Musselburgh, EUSA Vice President.
- Kezia Dugdale MSP – Labour MSP for Lothian region, EUSA campaigns adviser.
- George Foulkes, Baron Foulkes of Cumnock PC – Former Labour MP and MSP, SRC Senior President (1963–1964).
- James S. Jeffrey – Surgeon, EUU President and SRC President
- Edward Lindsay Ince FRSE – Mathematician, SRC Senior President.
- Eleanor Laing MP – Deputy Speaker of the House of Commons, Conservative MP for Epping Forest, EUSA Union President (1980–1981).
- Malcolm Macleod – Neurologist, former Rector of the University of Edinburgh, EUSA President (1988–1989).
- Peter McColl – Former Rector of the University of Edinburgh and political activist, EUSA Vice President (2001–2002).
- Sheila McKechnie – Chairman of the Consumer's Association and Shelter, SRC Junior President (1968–1969)
- Hugh Murray – Athlete, EUU President
- Sir David Orme Masson KBE FRS – Chemist, helped found SRC.
- David Steel, Baron Steel of Aikwood KT KBE PC – Former MP, MSP and Leader of the Liberal Party, SRC Senior President.
- Sir Frederick Whyte KCSI – British civil servant, Liberal Party MP, first President of the Central Legislative Assembly of British India, EUU President (1903–1904).

== See also ==
- The Diagnostic Society of Edinburgh
- Edinburgh Labour Students
- Edinburgh University A.F.C.
- Edinburgh University Boat Club
- Edinburgh University Highland Society
- Edinburgh University Orienteering Club
- Edinburgh University RFC
- Edinburgh University Shinty Club
- Edinburgh University Socialist Society
- Grand Edinburgh Adventuring Society
