= Gilded Balloon =

Live entertainment company

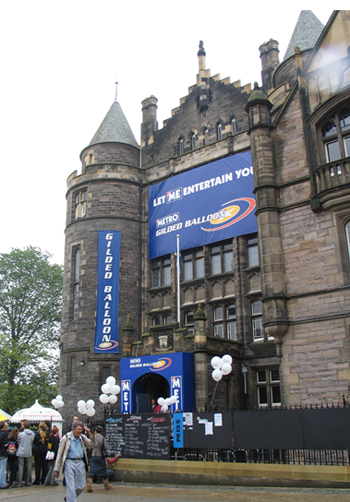
The Gilded Balloon at Teviot Row House, during the 2004 festival

Gilded Balloon is a producer and promoter of live entertainment events, based in Edinburgh, Scotland, and best known as one of the Big Four venue operators at the Edinburgh Festival Fringe each August.

The company has its origins in a venue known as The Gilded Balloon on Edinburgh's Cowgate, where artistic director Karen Koren first started promoting comedy events in 1986. When a fire in 2002 destroyed the original premises, Gilded Balloon shifted its Fringe operations to Teviot Row House in Bristo Square, which became the company's main venue.

Gilded Balloon also operates outside the Fringe, running year round events at the Rose Theatre, Edinburgh.

== History ==
Gilded Balloon founder, Karen Koren, started promoting comedy at McNally's, a restaurant and club based in a townhouse at 6 Palmerston Place, near Haymarket Station, which opened in February 1985. The owner had intended to open a casino upstairs, but it was rejected for a licence. Koren, who was working there alongside other part-time jobs, including working for the Norwegian Consulate, was well-connected to people involved with the Comedy Store and had been observing the growth of comedy during the Edinburgh Fringe each year. Instead of the intended casino, she turned the room into a year-round performance space for comedians, particularly Scottish ones. Early performances included Craig Ferguson, Jerry Sadowitz, and duo Alan Cumming and Forbes Masson as glam double-act Victor and Barry.

The Gilded Balloon itself was established by Karen Koren in 1986, staging seven shows a day in a building on Cowgate that was formerly J. & R. Allan's department store. The building was built in 1823 by James Spittal, a draper and silk merchant, who used it as a warehouse for his shop "The Gilded Balloon". It had twelve arches and a gentle curve on its South Bridge side. Its 3am late-licence meant it became a place for socialising, and Late'n'Live, a raucous late night show was started there. It became "a natural home" for comedians.

In 1988, the Gilded Balloon devised the competition "So You Think You're Funny", which has been won by many notable comics including Rhona Cameron, Lee Mack, Dylan Moran, Tommy Tiernan and Peter Kay; other finalists have included Ed Byrne, Jason Byrne, Ardal O'Hanlon and Johnny Vegas. The competition was sponsored by Channel 4 from 1993 until 2004, with five and the Paramount Comedy Channel taking over in 2005. Karen Koren is one of the major supporters of Australian comedy talent, and has produced a number of notable Australian acts at the Gilded Balloon over the years, including Greg Fleet, and is particularly noted for being the springboard for the careers of Tim Minchin and Drags Aloud.

During his early career, Russell Brand was forcefully ejected from the Gilded Balloon.

In 2001, the Gilded Balloon expanded to include Teviot Row House in Bristo Square, which is owned by the Edinburgh University Students' Association. On 7 December 2002, a fire devastated its original Cowgate base. In 2007, the C venues used the space to create a new venue, the "Soco Urban Garden". For a short while the Gilded Balloon ran comedy nights at the Festival Theatre Studio in Edinburgh.

== Current venues ==
The Gilded Balloon continues to use Teviot Row House which, in 2014, contained nine performance spaces, The Debating Hall being the biggest, seating 360, and The Turret being the smallest at 50 seats. Other venues include The Dining Room, The Wine Bar, The Wee Room, The Nightclub, The Sportsman's, The Balcony and The Billiard room.

In recent years, the Gilded Balloon has expanded into different venues. For several years it has held Fringe events at the National Museum of Scotland, billed as Gilded Balloon at the Museum. For one year in 2016, it also took over the Counting House venue from Laughing Horse and ran it on a pay-what-you-want model for audiences. Then in 2017, it took over the former Charlotte Chapel on Rose Street, now owned by dancer Peter Schaefuss. It now runs this as Gilded Balloon at the Rose Theatre on a year-round basis. Finally, in 2019, the Gilded Balloon started operating in two more venues - the Old Tolbooth Market, which had been a Free Fringe venue the previous year, and Adam House, which for many years had been the main venue in C Venues portfolio. The latter was billed as the Patter Hoose.

Karen Koren's daughter, Katy Koren, became joint artistic director in 2015, with a view to taking over from her mother in due course.

Gilded Balloon's year round base is on Commercial Street in Leith.
