= Robert Fitzroy Bell =

Scottish publisher and student leader (1859–1908)

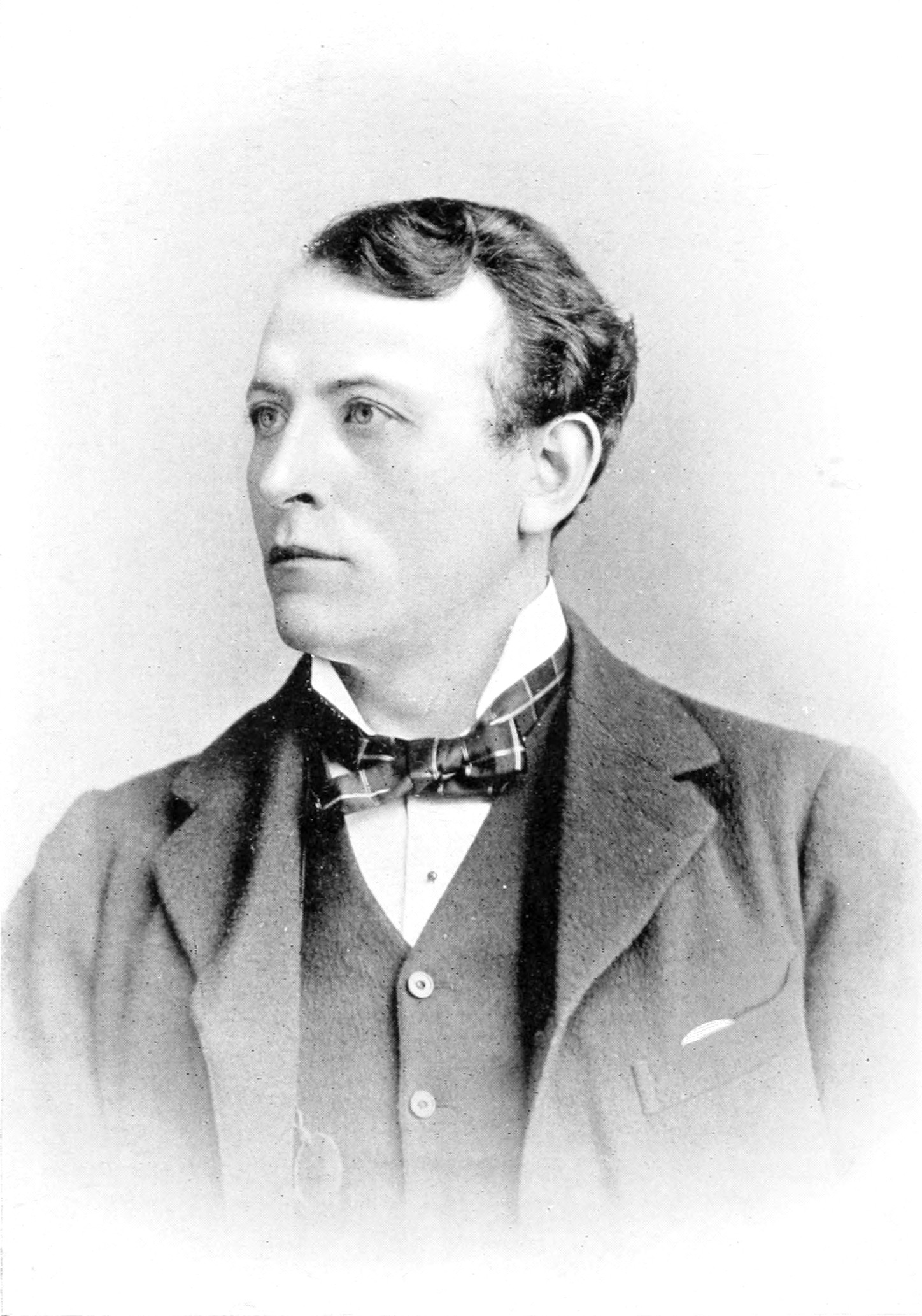
- Born: 7 July 1859; Morningside, Edinburgh, Scotland
- Died: 23 October 1908 (aged 49); Coldingham, Berwickshire, Scotland
- Education: Edinburgh Collegiate School; University of Edinburgh; University of Jena; University of Berlin
- Occupations: Publisher; Advocate
- Spouse: Isabella Cameron Gunn (m. 1892)

Robert Fitzroy Bell (7 July 1859 – 23 October 1908) was a Scottish publisher and advocate. In 1884 he founded the students' representative council (SRC) at the University of Edinburgh.

== Biography ==
Bell was born in Morningside, Edinburgh to Joanna (née Brockie) and Charles Bell, a corn merchant. He attended Edinburgh Collegiate School, followed by the University of Edinburgh in 1875, graduating in 1879. He then studied at the University of Jena and University of Berlin, before returning to the University of Edinburgh to study law.

Whilst a student at Edinburgh he was president of the Edinburgh University Conservative Association and the Speculative Society, and helped organise the election of Stafford Northcote as rector of the university. In 1884 he founded the students' representative council, inspired by a visit to the University of Strasbourg where he had learnt about the Studenten Ausschuss there. The first meeting was held in February 1884, with David Orme Masson as the first president, and Bell serving as the SRC's second president. With James Avon Clyde, Bell was joint secretary of the SRC committee that raised the funds to build the Edinburgh University Union (now known as Teviot Row House).

Student representative councils were soon established at the universities of Aberdeen, Glasgow and St Andrews, with the Universities (Scotland) Act 1889 giving the SRCs a statutory basis. The SRC model was later adopted by universities across the British Empire.

In 1883 Bell was admitted to the Faculty of Advocates. In 1889 Bell was appointed secretary of the Scottish Universities Commission, a position he held until 1900.

In 1888, with Walter Biggar Blaikie and Robert Tyndale Hamilton Bruce, he launched a weekly paper, the Scots Observer: An Imperial Review. Most of the funding was provided by Bell. In 1889 W. E. Henley was recruited as editor, with writers including J. M. Barrie, Rudyard Kipling, H. G. Wells and W. B. Yeats. In 1890 the paper relocated to London and was retitled as The National Observer. The paper was not a financial success, and in 1894 Bell sold the paper at a loss.

In 1892 Bell married Isabella Cameron Gunn, and in 1894 he purchased the Temple Hall estate in Coldingham, Berwickshire. In 1898 he edited the memoirs of John Murray of Broughton. In the 1906 general election he unsuccessfully contested the Berwickshire constituency for the Conservative Party.

Bell died 23 October 1908 at Temple Hall, aged 49, from a paralytic stroke. He was buried in Coldingham. In 1937 a memorial plaque commemorating Bell and the establishment of the SRC was erected in the Edinburgh University Union.

== Publications ==
- Murray, John (1898). Bell, Robert Fitzroy (ed.). Memorials of John Murray of Broughton.
