= Conpulsion =

Gaming convention held in Edinburgh, Scotland

- Genre: Gaming
- Venue: Teviot Row House
- Location: Edinburgh
- Country: Scotland
- Inaugurated: 1987
- Website: https://www.conpulsion.org/

Conpulsion is the oldest gaming convention in Scotland, hosted by the Edinburgh University Roleplaying Society (GEAS) annually in Teviot Student Union, Edinburgh. It predominantly features role-playing games and live action role-playing games, but also includes wargames, board games, collectible card games, and non-collectible card games. The convention also has a strong focus on giving money to charity, in a similar vein to many Irish conventions.

== History ==
Conpulsion began in 1987 as Dungeon Aid, in a nod to Band Aid and Live Aid, with the intent to raise money for charity through gaming. After the first few years it was renamed Big Con, then later Conpulsion in 1995. After growing gradually in popularity through the late 80s and 90s the convention moved from The Pleasance buildings to Teviot in 1999, where it has been held since.

The 2005 event played host to the launch of Warhammer Fantasy Roleplay 2nd Edition.

In 2012, Conpulsion began "themeing" the event, starting with Apocalypse in reference to the Mayan Apocalypse predicted for December that year. This continued in 2013 with Espionage, 2014 with Innovation, and 2015 with Overboard. The 2015 closing ceremony announced the theme for 2016 would be Underworld.

== Banquo Award ==
Starting in 2004, and annually since 2007, Conpulsion has hosted the award ceremony for the Banquo Award, which recognises those encapsulating the "Spirit of Scottish Gaming".

Winners
Name	Year
Morgan Davie	2004
John Wilson	2007
Janet Kerr	2008
Malcolm Craig	2009
Sean Maguire	2010
Sandy Douglas	2011
Paul Bourne	2012
Craig Oxbrow	2013
Sophia George	2014
Gregor Hutton	2015
Iain Lowson	2016
Phil Harris	2017
Hugh Hancock	2018
Jon Hodgson	2019
Bez Shahriari	2020
Dave Allsop	2021
David Wright	2022
Tanya Floaker	2023

== Griffie Awards ==
Since 2012, Conpulsion has annually presented two awards for the best RPG and best Board/Card Game released in the past year, voted on by attendees.

RPG Winners
Game	Publisher	Year
Dark Harvest: Legacy of Frankenstein	Cubicle 7	2012
Dungeon World	Sage Kobold Productions	2013
Mindjammer	Mindjammer Press	2014
Pirates & Dragons	Cakebread & Walton	2015 (joint)
Call of Cthulhu 7th Edition	Chaosium	2015 (joint)

Board/Card Game Winners
Game	Publisher	Year
Ora et Labora	Lookout Games	2012
Android: Netrunner	Fantasy Flight Games	2013
Eldritch Horror	Fantasy Flight Games	2014 (joint)
Mascarade	Repos Production	2014 (joint)
Frankenstein's Bodies	YAY! Games	2015
Astral Peace	format 15	2016

== Reception ==
In a review of the 2014 Conpulsion in Black Gate, M Harold Page said "Conpulsion always feels like a place rather than a fleeting confluence of people, a home to anybody who knows that there are more kinds of dice than six-sided ones. I'll certainly be back next year and plan to spend as much time gaming as possible."
