= Role reversal =

Psychotherapeutic technique

Role reversal is a psychotherapeutic technique in psychodrama that demonstrates a protagonist's intrapersonal conflicts deeply and explicitly on the stage. This technique is perhaps the single most important and effective technique in psychodrama. In the form of psychodrama, the protagonist is invited to move out of their own position or role into the significant other's position and enact that role. Therefore, the auxiliary ego can observe and learn how to play the role. For example, in a parent-child's session, a protagonist who is the child reverses role with one of their parents. This technique not only helps the protagonist get more insight of a specific role but also helps the director, the auxiliary egos, and the audience learn more about that specific role.

== Theory ==
Psychodrama has three important techniques: the technique of doubling, the technique of mirroring, and the technique of role reversal. Each technique represents different stages in Moreno's theory of the development of the infant: the stage of identity (the stage of doubling), the stage of the recognition of the self (the stage of mirroring), and the stage of the recognition of the other (the stage of role reversal). Role reversal requires that one has learned to differentiate in the areas of time, place and person, and is capable of moving out of their own position into another's position to be able to enact that other role.

== Method ==
Role reversal involves the changing of positions between the protagonist and their significant other, such as family members, friends, or people in school or in a workplace. The protagonist is invited to show the posture, the way of speaking, the behavior, the emotion, the attitude, and any other information of their significant other. This technique helps the protagonist explore any information of the role. Several books have described how to conduct role reversal.

== Function ==
Psychodramatist and author Lewis Yablonsky proposes four reasons for the function of role reversal. He takes a mother-daughter relationship as an example. First of all, role reversal helps the protagonist to feel and understand the other role and how it reacts with its environment. For example, the daughter gets more awareness about how her mother feels about and reacts to the role of the daughter.

The second reason is that role reversal helps the protagonist observe himself as if in a mirror. Through playing her mother's role, the daughter sees the role of daughter from her mother's perspective. Yablonsky provides the daughter description, for example: "From the vantage point of my mother, I saw for the first time that she feels badly about her age and her looks and is putting me down because she has begun to compete with me."

The next reason is that role reversal prevents the protagonist from being trapped in their own defenses. Yablonsky provides another example about the fight within spouses. Through role reversal, the spouses change their positions with the other and then produce new insight of the whole interaction. This technique helps the protagonist to gain more understanding of a significant other rather than being stuck in their own perspective.

The last reason is that role reversal helps an auxiliary ego understand how a specific role that they are going to play will be perceived by the protagonist. For example, when the daughter plays the role of her mother, she provides some information and cues for the auxiliary ego to know how the role of mother should be played. This technique enables the protagonist and auxiliary to demonstrate the problematic situation that is perceived by the protagonist.

Besides the above reasons, role reversal is useful for a protagonist to gain control over a hierarchy situation with which the protagonist disagrees. Paul Holmes mentions that this technique also enables other group members to learn the protagonist's view of important people. Role reversal helps the protagonist see their interpersonal relationships more objectively and transcend the habitual limitations of egocentricity. In sum, role reversal helps the protagonist, the auxiliary, the director, and the audience to get more understanding of the dynamic interactions of the protagonist's life.

== See also ==
- Gestalt therapy § The empty chair technique
- Perspective-taking
- Rogerian argument § Related research on role reversal
- Role-playing
- The Prince and the Pauper
