= Chambers Street, Edinburgh =

Street in Edinburgh, Scotland

Coordinates: 55°56′51.39″N 3°11′19.75″W

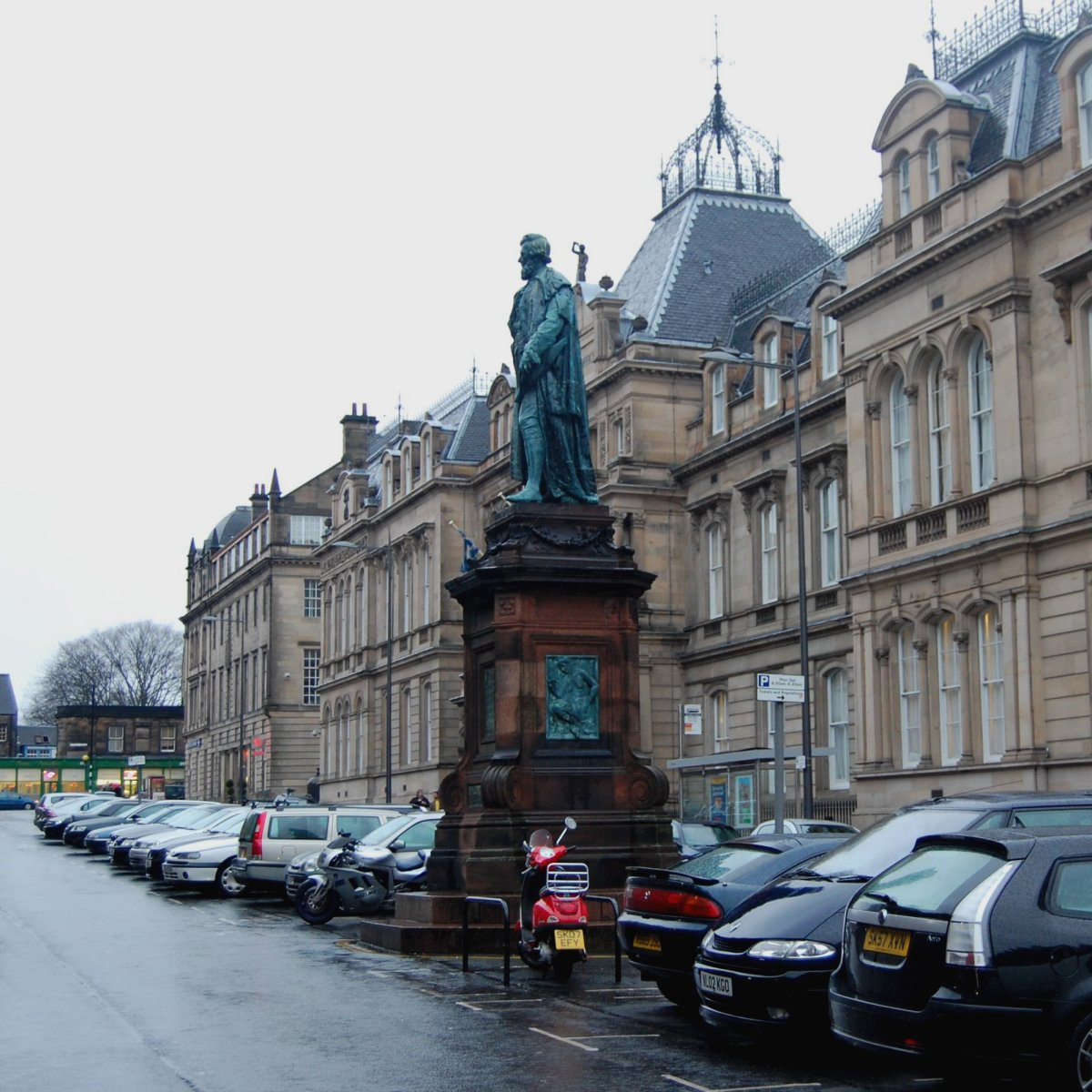
View of Chambers Street showing the statue of William Chambers of Glenormiston, after whom the street was named. The vehicles in the photograph are parked in the centre of the street in a manner more commonly seen in Edinburgh's New Town.

Chambers Street is a street in Edinburgh, Scotland, in the southern extremity of the Old Town. The street is named after William Chambers of Glenormiston, the Lord Provost of Edinburgh who was the main proponent of the Edinburgh Improvement Act (1867) which led to its creation in 1870. A narrow lane named North College Street and three residential squares built in the 18th century—Adam Square, Argyle Square and Brown Square—disappeared in the process. The street is dominated by University and museum buildings. It also hosts a variety of restaurants and venues.

== Notable buildings ==
Buildings by date of completion:

- Old College, University of Edinburgh, 1791–1827 (Old College faces onto South Bridge, and predates the construction of Chambers Street; the facade to Chambers Street is noticeably flat for a building designed variously by Robert Adam and William Henry Playfair)
- Minto House, 1878, the site was formerly the home of Lord Dunsinane, now the University of Edinburgh Department of Architecture
- Royal Museum, 1888
- Adam House, University of Edinburgh, 1953 (designed by William Kininmonth)
- Edinburgh Sheriff Court, 1995
- Museum of Scotland, 1998
- Former Edinburgh Dental Hospital and School
