= Robert Cochrane Buist =

Scottish physician (1860–1939)

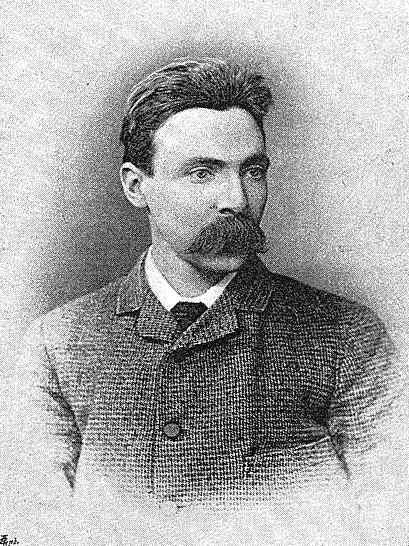
- Born: 9 August 1860; Dundee, Scotland
- Died: 5 February 1939 (aged 78); Dundee, Scotland
- Education: High School of Dundee; University of St Andrews; Corpus Christi College, Cambridge; University of Edinburgh
- Occupations: Obstetrician; Gynaecologist

Robert Cochrane Buist (9 August 1860 – 5 February 1939) was a Scottish obstetrician and gynaecologist.

== Biography ==
Buist was born in Dundee, Scotland, and attended the High School of Dundee. He then studied mathematics at the University of St Andrews, graduating in 1881. He then studied for the mathematics tripos at Corpus Christi College, Cambridge, graduating in 1883. Buist then began studying medicine at the University of Edinburgh. While a student at the university he founded and edited a small fortnightly student magazine, The Student, in 1887, which remains in publication. He also served as president of the students' representative council.

Buist worked as an assistant physician at the Royal Edinburgh Asylum before returning to Dundee to specialise in obstetrics. In 1901 he was appointed lecturer of clinical midwifery and gynaecology at the University of St Andrews. He was also an honorary obstetrician and gynaecologist to the Dundee Royal Infirmary and a consultant to the Perth Royal Infirmary. He was a member of the Royal College of Physicians of Edinburgh.

Buist became a vegetarian in 1879 and was vice-president of the Dundee Vegetarian Society in 1897.

He retired in 1925 and died 5 February 1939 in Dundee.
