= Auxiliary ego =

Position taken by participants in a role-playing exercise

An auxiliary ego, also known as simply an auxiliary, is the position taken by other participants in a role-playing exercise, or psychodrama, in order to simulate particular situations for the protagonists. Additionally in psychodrama, it can also be a role of representative figures in the protagonist’s life assumed by any person between the group members on the stage, excluding the therapist. Another conceptualization describes it in psychodrama as "the representation of absentees, individuals, delusions, symbols, ideals, animals, and objects" that make the protagonist's world real and tangible.

== Technique ==
As role-playing can include more than one protagonist, each may be operating in the role of auxiliary ego to each other as the exploration of each role changes with the entrance of new situations. The director of the role-play, often a teacher or counselor, can also be an auxiliary and typically is when clients are in the position of protagonist. It is also noted that the role of the auxiliary ego is crucial because in the course of the role-playing, its behavior provokes the protagonist into a deeper involvement in the drama.

The auxiliary ego is also used as a pyschotherapeutic technique, offering a way to address personal and interpersonal problems stimulatenously. It induces a "triangular neurosis", an interpersonal disturbance involving three individuals that allows the patients to begin identifying the psychological level at which they are most spontaneous. Here, a person takes on the role of another person and act as if he is this person in therapeutic session. In the process, a protagonist's life (past, present, future) can be recreated with others in the group assuming roles that complete the psychodrama. Members of the group do not necessarily need training and participate out of their desire to help.

== Children ==
For infants, the auxiliary ego is ideally provided by the mother (also called instinctive auxiliary ego), who is often able to anticipate his needs and to consolidate his gains in his development. There are also psychoanalysts who hold that caregivers can provide infants with auxiliary ego since this said to enhance their ability to survive. The idea is that it contributes in the ego's experience, helping shape the child's psychic organization and achieve the optimal psychic development.

== Baby Boomers−Generation Z ==
=== Technological Influence ===
In the realm of psychoanalysis, there are different generations of patients growing in conditions each developed in respective social, economic, and historical manners. From the baby boomers’ generation to the 21st century generation (Gen Z), informational technologies are overtaking the auxiliary ego’s roles in the patients. This event alters parenting patterns up to Generation Z.

Although these technologies present negative impacts to the patients, there are potential benefits in this growing generation, which is what the analysts are trying to understand. To analyze adolescent patients' behaviors in this generation, they establish transference-countertransference relationships with them, which involves the use and psychological responses to technologies.

=== Parenting Patterns ===
According to Neil Altman’s article, he described how ideological changes in parenting patterns in the baby boomers’ generation shaped Generation X. Some of these parenting patterns become less authoritative around this time of older generations, which decreases parental influences with their children, thus making it more difficult for children to form their identities. The absence of parental figures for psychological guidance also inhibits the children’s identity formation. So, in the late 20th century, they withdrew from this tradition and instead must both form their identity and design a ‘self’ on their own.

Regardless of the confusion, this process comes with benefits and drawbacks. Simultaneously, the reason lies in no transferring between ego ideals and superego limits among generations, yet this process is critical for identity formation during adolescence (secondary separation-individuation phase). So altogether, they then receive no opposition from parents, authorities, nor limit-settings for proper auxiliary ego development.

=== 'Pseudo-pseudo-mature' Behavior ===
A comment from Viviane Sprinz Mondrzak regarding Donald Meltzer referred to this new adolescent generation as ‘pseudo-pseudo-mature.’ In this context, he described the term as a behavior to act adult-like (pseudo-mature) while failing to detect and deny one's dependence on the adult (personality) addiction; lacking dependence-denial attitude.

=== Techs in Gen Z ===
Once technological devices become more accessible, they become another replacement for the missing components of identity formation. This compensation causes adolescents to attach to and depend more on technology. Eventually, they become auxiliary egos for the users, which leads the focus to Generation Z.

The adolescents in Generation Z are growing alongside the advancing technologies - personal computers, smartphones, and Internet devices. They live in a period where these technologies become part of their daily basis, especially when they provide ideal psychological resources for self-regulation, including internal conflicts and impulses, for anything at any time.

They can access most information with ease, create virtual profiles to compensate for narcissistic disappointments they have in the reality. They can interact in social media and experience all necessary aspects, for what leads to all self-objection - narcissistic and exhibitionistic forms of omnipotence, idealization, and alter ego.

Because these devices can provide needs independent from adults’ assistance, teens feel more superior to their parents and other authority figures. This accomplishment follows with the secondary Oedipal conflict (Oedipus Complex) they re-encounter in their lifetime. In short, Oedipal conflict (Oedipus Complex) is a term used in Sigmund Freud’s psychosexual development stages theory, which describes the boy’s desiring feelings for his mother while expressing jealousy and anger towards his father.

=== Transference-Countertransference ===
Transference and Countertransference are terms used in therapy in relation between clients or patients and a therapist or clinician. Transference is the phenomenon when a person unconsciously transfers feelings and attitudes from people or situations in the past onto another party in the present situation. This can occur for instance, when clients or patients direct their feelings for one significant person to the clinician. Countertransference shares the same unconscious phenomenon but happens during the patient’s responses after receiving transference. In the context of the previous example, the clinician can transfer his/her feelings onto the patients.

==== Relationships ====
In one of the clinical cases, the patient listens to the clinician’s struggle without setting boundaries with him (countertransference) after the patient declared his feelings to the clinician (transference). The clinician found himself in a position of confrontation with his paralyzing avoidance and the Internet dependence. On the other hand, the patient interpreted the clinician’s position as an attack on his self-objects and psychological defenses against his narcissistic self-devaluation and depression state.

There are 3 major factors which increase demands for transference: the situation of patient’s emotional dependency towards the clinician, specific relationship settings of patients the clinician must recognize and meet, and individual types of personality where the internal world is compellingly projected onto the present.

==== Psychoanalytic Intervention ====
In one of the psychoanalytic interventions, Dr. Scott Boles described how he approached a severely disturbed four-year-old boy, Sam, both as Sam’s auxiliary ego and superego, via experiences including from their transference-countertransference relationship. From the intervention that ended in two years, Dr. Boles noted the therapeutic effect of analysis relating to the sessions held for Sam during the treatment process, and helping the child to acknowledge, bear and regulate one’s emotions. The process was achievable by setting up interactive environments for Sam to experience, including implying the limit-setting to his playful session with punishments if crossing harmful thresholds.

After two years, the analysis ended in an abrupt manner, for which according to Dr. Leon Hoffman, could be due to no communication between the child regarding Dr. Boles acting as Sam's auxiliary ego and superego roles, combined with no direct guidance to limit-setting upon Sam's permissive aggression following a punishment threat. Meanwhile from Dr. Hoffman’s perspective, Dr. Boles performed as a developmental object for Sam, through attempts at helping the child to control and identify his feelings, especially aggression, and in hopes of building his mental structure.

Overall, Dr. Hoffman, in reference to Dr. Boyle's results of this analysis, remarked on the importance of the analysts as auxiliary ego or superego (or both) for the child to overcome one's emotions, feelings, and emerging wishes whether one can control. He further stated the requirement for all analysts and therapists to frequently self-educate around their careers and from the errors made, such as bypassing the patient's mental defenses and precociously uncovering the patient's wishes - ending the analysis from the patient leaving.

== See also ==
- GEAS
