= Edinburgh University Women's Union =

Former students' union in Edinburgh, Scotland

- Merged into: Edinburgh University Students' Association
- Formation: October 1905
- Dissolved: 1 July 1973
- Type: Students' union
- Location: Edinburgh, Scotland

Edinburgh University Women's Union was a students' union for women at the University of Edinburgh in Edinburgh, Scotland. The union became the Chambers Street Union before accepting the admission of men to membership in 1971, ahead of merging into the new Edinburgh University Students' Association in 1973.

== Founding ==
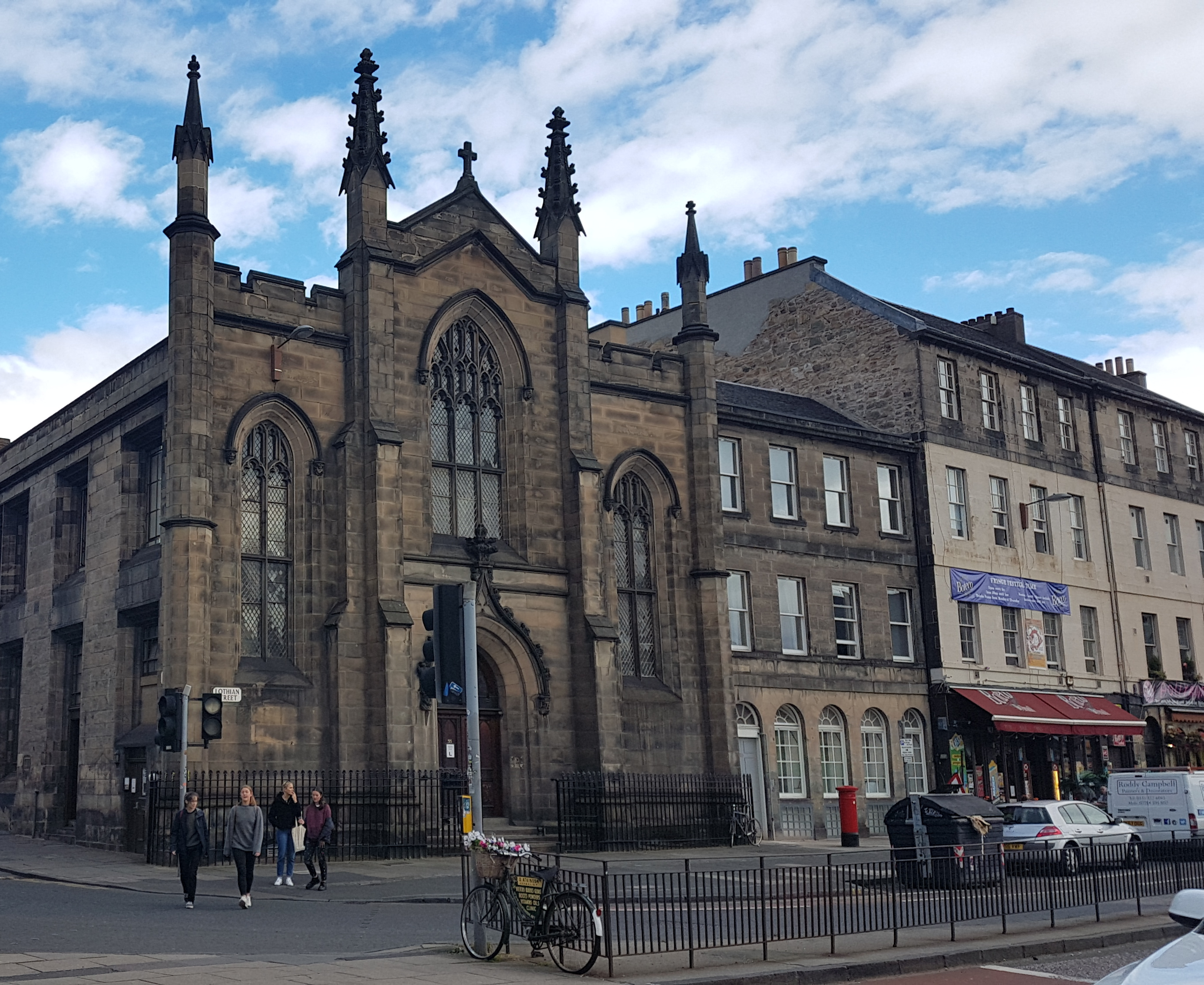
The original site of the Women's Union can be seen adjacent (right) to Jericho House (left) at 53 Lothian Street.

Despite there being more than 400 women students at the University of Edinburgh in 1905, the Edinburgh University Union continued to only admit men as members. To meet the needs of women students, the Women's Union was established in October 1905 at 53 Lothian Street. The premises contained a reading room, drawing room and dining room.

== Change of premises and fundraising ==
As the number of female students rose in the early part of the 20th century, the original premises became unsuitable. In 1908, £2000 was raised through a fundraising bazaar to extend the premises. In April 1920 the Union moved to 52 and 53 George Square. The new building had been partly funded by £1000 gifted by The Carnegie Trust and £450 raised through a fete. The premises included reading and dining rooms, lounges, and bedrooms available for brief stays. In 1926, in celebration of the Union's 21st anniversary, Atalanta's Garland: Edinburgh University Women's Union, a collection of pictures and writing from a variety of literary figures, was published as a fundraiser. The collection included pieces from Katherine Mansfield and Jessie M King, as well as Virginia Woolf's A Women's College from the Outside. Also involved in the publication was Cecile Walton, whose essay Atalanta in Caledonia was also included. In 1927, the Union moved to the basement of 54 George Square.

== Edinburgh University Tea Club ==
In addition to the founding of the Women's Union, the Edinburgh University Tea Club was founded in November 1920, first meeting in the Upper Library Hall of the Old College. This club aimed to provide an opportunity for social interaction for women associated with the teaching staff of the University. By 1945, various regular social activities including badminton, golf, tennis and folk-dancing were taking place.

== Chambers Street Union ==
The Union building was demolished in 1964 to make way for the new William Robertson building, and the Union moved to 16 Chambers Street. At this point the Union changed its name to the Chambers Street Union. The Union voted to admit men as members shortly before Edinburgh University Union voted to admit women in February 1971.

== Merger ==
Following initial opposition, on 1 July 1973 the Students' Representative Council, the Edinburgh University Union and the Chambers Street Union merged to form Edinburgh University Students' Association.

== Presidents and Notable members ==
- Patricia Taylor-Young – President of the Women's Union 1954.
- June Paterson-Brown, née Garden CBE CVO – President of the Women's Union 1955.
- Jennie Lee, Baroness Lee of Asheridge PC – Socialist politician, Labour Party MP, Minister for the Arts.
- Catherine Snodgrass – Geographer.
