= Adam House =

Building in Edinburgh, Scotland

Coordinates: 55.9481°N 3.1873°W

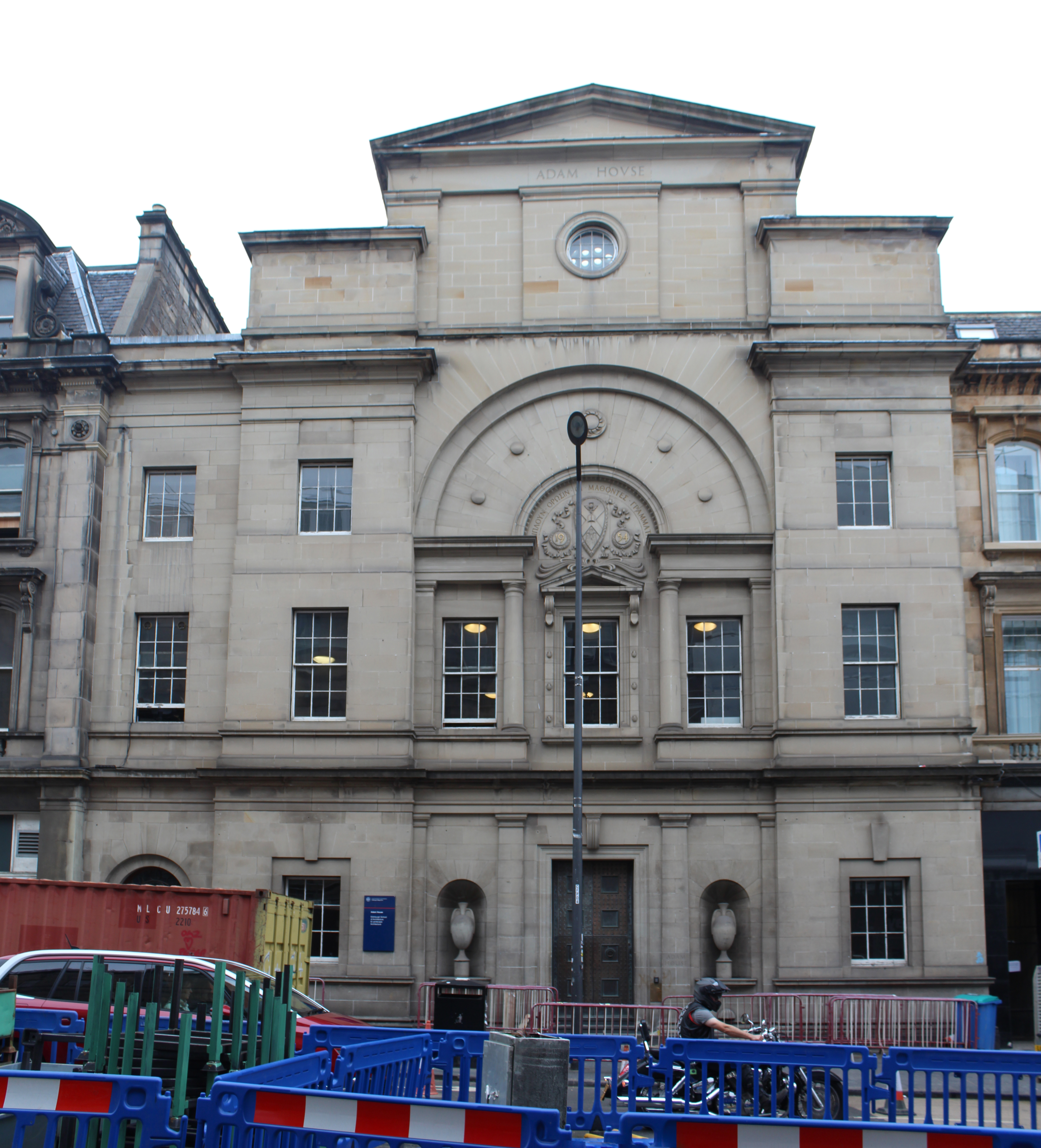
Adam House

Adam House is a Category B listed building in Edinburgh, Scotland. It is owned by the University of Edinburgh, and used as studio spaces for the architecture school. It consists of 4 studio spaces and a lecture theatre.

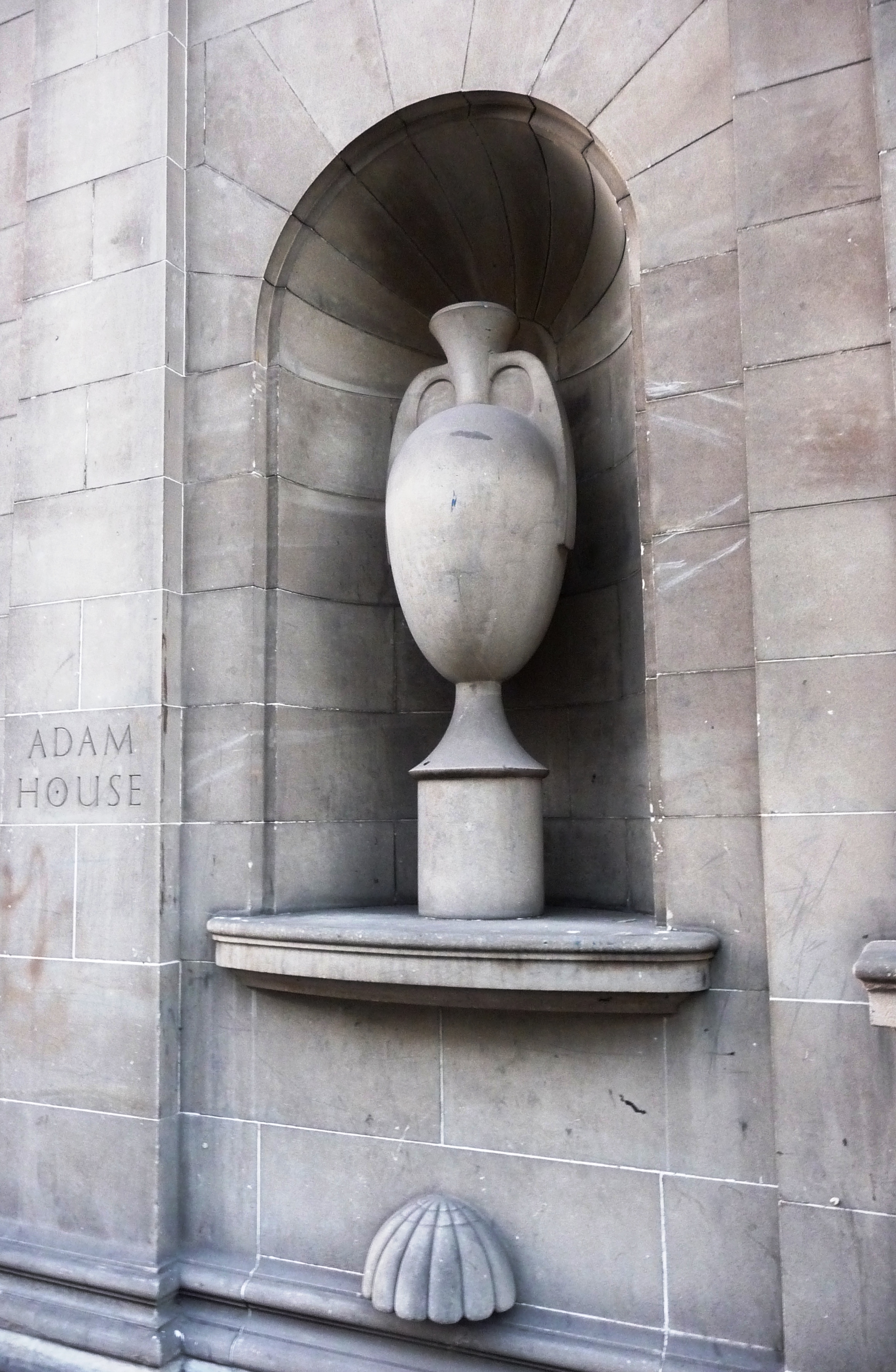
External detail from Adam House

The four storey building with basement, at 5 and 6 Chambers Street, was built in a modern neo-classical style by William H Kininmonth, a leading Scottish exponent of Modernism, and dates to 1954. It includes a 164-seat basement theatre space, as well as the architecture studios. These were built to the rear of the building to limit traffic and other noise pollution.

The building's name commemorates Adam Square, one of the three 18th-century residential squares demolished to make way for Chambers Street as part of the 1867 City Improvement Act.

As well as its use as an examination hall, it is also used as a venue for the Edinburgh Festival Fringe, the world's largest arts festival, where for many years it was operated by the company C venues. For the 2019 Fringe, rival promoters Gilded Balloon took over the building.
