= The Student (newspaper) =

Student-run newspaper at the University of Edinburgh

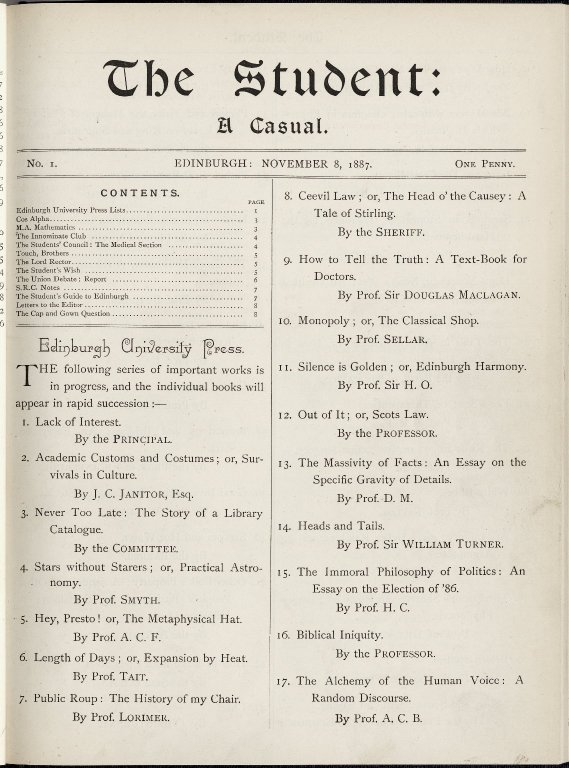
- First edition of The Student front page, 8 November 1887
- Type: Fortnightly newspaper
- Format: Berliner
- Editor: Amelie Jeeves, Elisa Vincent, and Lilia Harris
- Founded: 8 November 1887
- Political alignment: None
- Language: English
- Headquarters: The Pleasance, Edinburgh
- Circulation: 2,500 (25,000 per month online)
- Website: thestudentnews.co.uk

The Student is a fortnightly independent newspaper produced by students at the University of Edinburgh. First started in 1887, the newspaper is distributed on Wednesdays and usually consists of 32 pages. It has a physical circulation of 2,500 copies per issue and is read by some 30,000 people in Edinburgh, as of 2017.

Since 1992, The Student has become financially and editorially independent from the University of Edinburgh and its students' association. It therefore relies on advertising and fundraising to cover costs. The newspaper is produced by volunteers, who fit this work around their studies. Since September 2017, the paper has switched from weekly production to its current fortnightly format.

The newspaper held the title of Best Student Newspaper in Scotland – awarded by The Herald Student Press Awards – in 2006, 2007, 2009 and 2010. It also won the Student Publication Association's Best Publication Award in 2024.

== History ==
The Student started in 1887 as a small fortnightly magazine, founded by Robert Cochrane Buist. In 1889 the Students' Representative Council took over publishing the paper from Buist. The Student has stated that it was founded by Robert Louis Stevenson. A typical, turn-of-the-century edition of The Student would open with a short biography of a notable person and an editorial. The remaining content largely comprised notes from various societies, sports results, poetry and literary reviews, and profiles of newly appointed lecturers. The magazine was supported by advertising, but cost two pence.

By the 1970s, The Student had become a weekly newspaper, roughly Berliner in format. The running of the newspaper was – by this stage – in the control of the Student Publications Board, a body independent of the university. It was during the first half of the 1970s that Gordon Brown, future British prime minister, was a news editor. The type of content had shifted to reflect the times: a typical copy would contain pages on news, the environment, society, features, politics and entertainment. By this point, the price had risen to five pence.

The 1990s saw the introduction of computers to the newspaper; the offices were also moved from the Student Publications Board offices at 1 Buccleuch Place to their present location in the Pleasance, anecdotally held to be space reclaimed after the closure of a monkey-testing lab. Initially, the newspaper was laid out on Apple Macintosh computers. During this period, Darius Danesh briefly wrote for the paper, as a film and music critic.

The paper, then in tabloid format, won The Herald Student Media Award for best newspaper in 1998, 2006, 2007, 2008 and 2010 and the Guardian Student Media Awards for Best Newspaper on a Shoestring in 2001. The paper was redesigned several times in the lead-up to the millennium, winning The Herald award for its design in 2004. After failing to win the same award the following year, the paper was again radically redesigned in 2006.

Many of The Student's former writers have gone on to become internationally renowned journalists and politicians. Past staff members of The Student include the former British Prime Minister Gordon Brown; Lord Steel; Robin Cook; and many of Fleet Street's reporters and editors. Recent graduates include Guardian staff writer and editor Helen Pidd and BBC radio reporter Chris Page.

=== Financial issues ===
In 1992, The Student, which had been selling for 20 pence, was dropped by the students' association as part of a cost-cutting exercise. A grant of £5,000 from the University Development Fund allowed it to continue as a student society for a few years. By 1997, the newspaper was under severe financial pressure, selling only around a thousand copies a week at 20 pence each; the advertising was largely ineffective. During the course of the year, the newspaper stopped publishing to avoid going into debt and a relaunch was scheduled for the start of the autumn term, with a shift towards a free distribution model. This shift resulted in a wholesale change in how the newspaper was produced. For the first time, the newspaper was printed on a web offset press; full colour printing was available; and the newspaper was fully produced on computers, not old fashioned light boxes. The initial circulation after the relaunch was around 5,000 copies, distributed through cardboard stands around the various university campuses. To ease the transition, the newspaper was published on a fortnightly basis for a year. After a successful advertising funded first year the newspaper returned to being published weekly and within two years the circulation crept up to over 12,000 copies a week, aided by initiatives such as a second edition catering to the other universities within Edinburgh and a seven-day TV guide.

In early 2002, The Student's continuous run came to an end when the newspaper faced "five-figure debts". The official explanation was that the post-11 September 2001 climate had caused a downturn in advertising, something being widely claimed by other newspapers at the time. The newspaper was relaunched at the start of the 2002/03 academic year and advertising sales, which had been traditionally managed internally, began to be handled by the advertising department of the Students' Association, though the paper's committee now includes a Head of Advertising. The paper recovered quickly, returning to weekly publication with a redesign soon after the start of the next academic year.

In 2023, the students' association withdrew from its role as a major advertiser, putting the continuation of the print edition at risk. An online fundraiser raised over £4,500, enabling the print edition of 750 copies fortnightly to be continued.

== Notable pieces ==
=== 'Page Three' feature ===
In early 2005, The Student published an editorial discussing Page 3 models and nudity in the media, accompanied by two full-page, scantily-clad glamour model photographs: one of a male, the other of a female. The newspaper subsequently received a complaint from the Edinburgh University Islamic Society (ISocEd). The Edinburgh Evening News took up the story, which subsequently appeared in the national press, with the photograph of the female model appearing next to the story.

Newspapers claimed there had been "floods of complaints" and that the female model was in hiding. Catherine Harper of the 'Scottish Women Against Pornography' organisation said, "[this] will lead students to only view women as a pair of breasts." However, The Sun defended the publication of a page similar to its own, and offered the model a place in its paper.

=== 'Pure' controversy ===
In November 2006, The Student ran a series of front pages drawing readers' attention to the university's Christian Union, which was running a 'Pure' course which allegedly taught that homosexuality was a 'curable condition'. The Student complained that the course was being taught on university premises, at the Chaplaincy Centre, and that this breached the university's anti-discrimination policy. The course was subsequently banned temporarily, amid threats of litigation.

=== J. K. Rowling interview ===
In early March 2008, The Student published an interview with J. K. Rowling, author of the Harry Potter series. Rowling told The Student journalist Adeel Amini that she had considered suicide during her mid-20s but that she had overcome depression through counselling. On 23 March, newspapers from around the world, including USA Today, the British newspaper The Times, and several major Indian newspapers published the excerpt from Amini's interview.

=== Princess Anne controversies ===
In October 2011, The Student covered the appointment and inauguration of Princess Anne as chancellor of the University of Edinburgh, running the headline 'A Fucking Disgrace', a quote from a student onlooker for related protests. The university's administration banned the particular copy of The Student from distribution in academic buildings, citing offence caused to their staff members as the reason.

In October 2013, The Student released a story stating that two students had been removed from campus buildings and detained by royal protection officers ahead of a visit from Princess Anne, with one of the students alleging xenophobic abuse from university security guards. The story was picked up by The Independent and other mastheads.

=== EUSA censorship dispute ===
In January and February 2013, the Edinburgh University Students' Association took out an interdict against The Student to stop them publishing a story rumoured to be related to Max Crema, an EUSA sabbatical officer.

On 26 February, ex-Features editor of The Student, Cameron Taylor submitted two motions to EUSA, one a vote of no confidence against Max Crema and the other, a motion to censure James McAsh (President of EUSA). After a comment piece published in the Student explaining his actions, it was revealed that he had been behind the anonymous Facebook page and blog 'Are you happy with EUSA?'. An Emergency Special General Meeting was called for 6.30pm on Wednesday 6 March in George Square Lecture Theatre, to debate the two motions. The Student published a story in which editors Alistair Grant and Nina Seale interviewed both James McAsh and Max Crema about the actions they were being held accountable for. On 1 March, student John Wallace submitted another motion to hold a vote of no confidence against James McAsh. Both motions fell substantially short of the two-thirds majority required.

=== Esme Allman–Robbie Travers controversy ===
In September 2017, The Student released two interviews – one with former Edinburgh University Students' Association Black and Minority Ethnic (BME) Convenor Esme Allman, and the other with law student Robbie Travers, against whom Allman had filed a complaint. The paper dismissed earlier assertions in the national media that Travers had been investigated by Edinburgh University for 'mocking ISIS'. The SPA-award-winning interviews were subsequently picked up by The Guardian and other newspapers. Author J. K. Rowling commented on the controversy on her Twitter account.

== Notable former editors and staff members ==
- Gordon Brown (Prime Minister)
- Robin Cook (Foreign Secretary)
- George Foulkes (Minister of State for Scotland)
- David Steel (Leader, Liberal Party)
- Will Lyons (columnist, The Wall Street Journal)
- Helen Pidd (Northern Editor, The Guardian)
- Bill Turnbull (journalist and newsreader for the BBC)
- A. S. Neill (progressive educator, founder of Summerhill School)
- Amy Liptrot (author of The Outrun)
- Tom Bradby (Political Editor, ITV News)
- Jonathan Liew (sports journalist)
- Fern Brady (comedian and writer)
- Francine Toon (novelist and poet)
- Anna Coote Writer and policy analyst

== See also ==
- List of newspapers in Scotland
