= Bez Shahriari =

Scottish board game designer and mental health advocate

Bez Bonnie-Beth Shahriari is a Scottish board game designer and mental health advocate who has designed over 50 games, most of which are self-published under her brand Stuff by Bez. Her most commercially successful game is In a Bind, which was picked up by Gigamic and republished internationally as Yogi.

== Early life ==
Shahriari grew up in Glasgow and became interested in video games at an early age, watching her siblings play games on a ZX Spectrum before she started playing herself. At university, she studied videogame design for a year, but dropped out in the second year after the focus of the program moved away from game design to programming.

== Game Design ==
=== In a Bind ===
In 2012, Shahriari moved to London and became involved with Playtest UK, a cooperative group that helped game designers by playtesting their concepts. Her first design that came out of that group was In a Bind, of which she commented "I went all out for silliness. I had people running around the table, spinning in circles, hopping, even doing sit ups during playtests." Shahriari self-published the game under the label Stuff by Bez.

In 2016, French publisher Gigamic picked up In a Bind and released it as Yogi, selling over 100,000 copies in 20 languages.

Three Wibbell cards

=== Wibbell ===
Shahriari's second design was called Wibbell. This game uses a custom deck of 48 cards; each card has a pair of letters, a number and border art. The purpose of the game is to win cards by shouting out words that use letters from a card on the table and a card in one's hand.

Shahriari then used the same deck to create a story-telling game titled Faybell, as well as a pattern-recognition game titled Grabell. She renamed the deck Wibbell++ to recognize its multipurpose function. In 2015, she came up with the concept of releasing a new Wibbell++ game every August 1.

In 2021 she changed the name of Wibbell++ to the ELL Deck.

In his 2021 book Board Games as Media, Paul Booth quotes Shahriari about her game design philosophy: "The world doesn't need just another game about farming that is done basically the same way... I just feel like you've got to seriously look at yourself and think, what is this game adding to the landscape of gaming?"

=== Other games ===
Shahriari continued to self-publish games for Stuff by Bez, but has also designed games for other publishers, including:

- Flowers in Towers as part of Dice & Ink: A Roll & Write Anthology by Inkwell Games
- Last Bug Standing in the Circle of Doom by Surprised Stare Games

== Honours ==
- At Conpulsion 2020, Shahriari was awarded the Banquo Award, which annually recognizes "those who have encapsulated the spirit of Scottish gaming."
- In his 2024 book Tabletop Game Accessibility: Meeple Centred Design , Michael James Heron identified Bez Shahriari as one of the "indie game publishers who took accessibility seriously even when there were so many other calls on their time."
