= Drags Aloud =

Australian drag troupe

Drags Aloud is an Australian drag entertainment troupe.

Drags Aloud is a troupe of performers, originating from Australia which was formed by a co-operative of leading Melbourne (Australia) drag queens in 2005.

== Members ==
The members of Drags Aloud are: Amanda Monroe and Jessica James. Former troupe members include drag performers: Linda Lamont, Kris del Vayze, Christina Andrews, Jillette Jones, Jackie Stevens, Miss Bunny and Roxy Bullwinkle.

== Drags Aloud variety program and formation of the group ==
Drags Aloud formed in 2005 when community television station Channel 31 aired an independently produced late night variety program titled "Drags Aloud" which featured the well known Melbourne drag troupes the "Showbags" and "The Manly Sisters". The series was filmed at Templebar Precinct restaurant in Collingwood. When the "Showbags" and "The Manly Sisters" group expanded their cast to present a newer innovative style of narrative drag performance, they renamed themselves Drags Aloud, in reference to the name recognition from their joint television series.

== Performances: 2007-2009 ==
Drags Aloud operated their own venue at the now defunct Newmarket Hotel in St Kilda where their style of drag production shows were developed and first presented. They were the first drag troupe to perform at the Melbourne International Comedy Festival, receiving an honorable mention at the Director's Awards and a cash prize. Following their Melbourne International Comedy Season, they were invited to perform at the Gilded Balloon venue in Edinburgh as part of the 2007 Edinburgh Festival Fringe with their satirical production "The Sound of Music Drag Show" lampooning the culture of 'Nazi Musicals'.

They consolidated this success with seasons at the Adelaide Fringe Festival and at the Melbourne International Comedy Festival. In August 2008 they presented "The Greased Lightin' Drag Show" which won them the prestigious Forth Radio Fringe Award. This was followed by seasons in London's West End (Leicester Square Theatre) and off Broadway at The Theatres at 45 Bleecker . These achievements made Drags Aloud one of the most successful Australian drag shows to date, being the first ever Australian drag show to perform Off-Broadway, and only the second ever Australian drag troupe to perform in West End Theater. Their New York season led to them being invited to open for Joan Rivers in March 2009 show at her comedy show in Melbourne.

== Relocation, dispersal, reformation ==
In 2011 Drags Aloud relocated to Europe to pursue their cabaret performance opportunities with the intention to return to Australia for regular appearances at festivals and for tour dates. In April 2012 Amanda Monroe left the group after a season at Adelaide Fringe Festival for her "Mangina: Tales of an XY Woman" solo show. After a season at the Dublin Gay Theatre Festival a newly configured Drags Aloud group closed down with members pursuing their own projects.

Subsequently, founding members Jessica James and Amanda Monroe re-formed and presented their "Mandy and Ca Ca Show" with seasons at Perth's Fringe World and Melbourne International Comedy Festival in 2014. James and Monroe now present Drags Aloud as corporate entertainment, with additional players hired as needed.

== Style ==
Drags Aloud's style of performance is comic-parody, usually performed with a narrative subtext which draws upon popular culture and which satirizes their own drag characterizations. Typically reviews described the troupe as cabaret performers using drag as both medium and message.

In Australia's long history with the drag genre, Drags Aloud was most notable for taking the art of drag from its usual preserve of gay clubs and out to a wider public. Drags Aloud had a performance style and presentation which consciously attempted to break down barriers between the perception of 'gay minority entertainment' and the wider community concept of 'theatrical entertainment'.

Drags Aloud's Amanda Monroe is the subject of a documentary by renowned documentary producer Linette Etheredge. (see:Wade in the Water). This documentary, titled "Amanda" debuted at the Sydney Mardi Gras Film Festival. (see Amanda Monroe at IMDB)
