= Rose Theatre, Edinburgh =

Arts venue in Edinburgh, Scotland

Rose Theatre
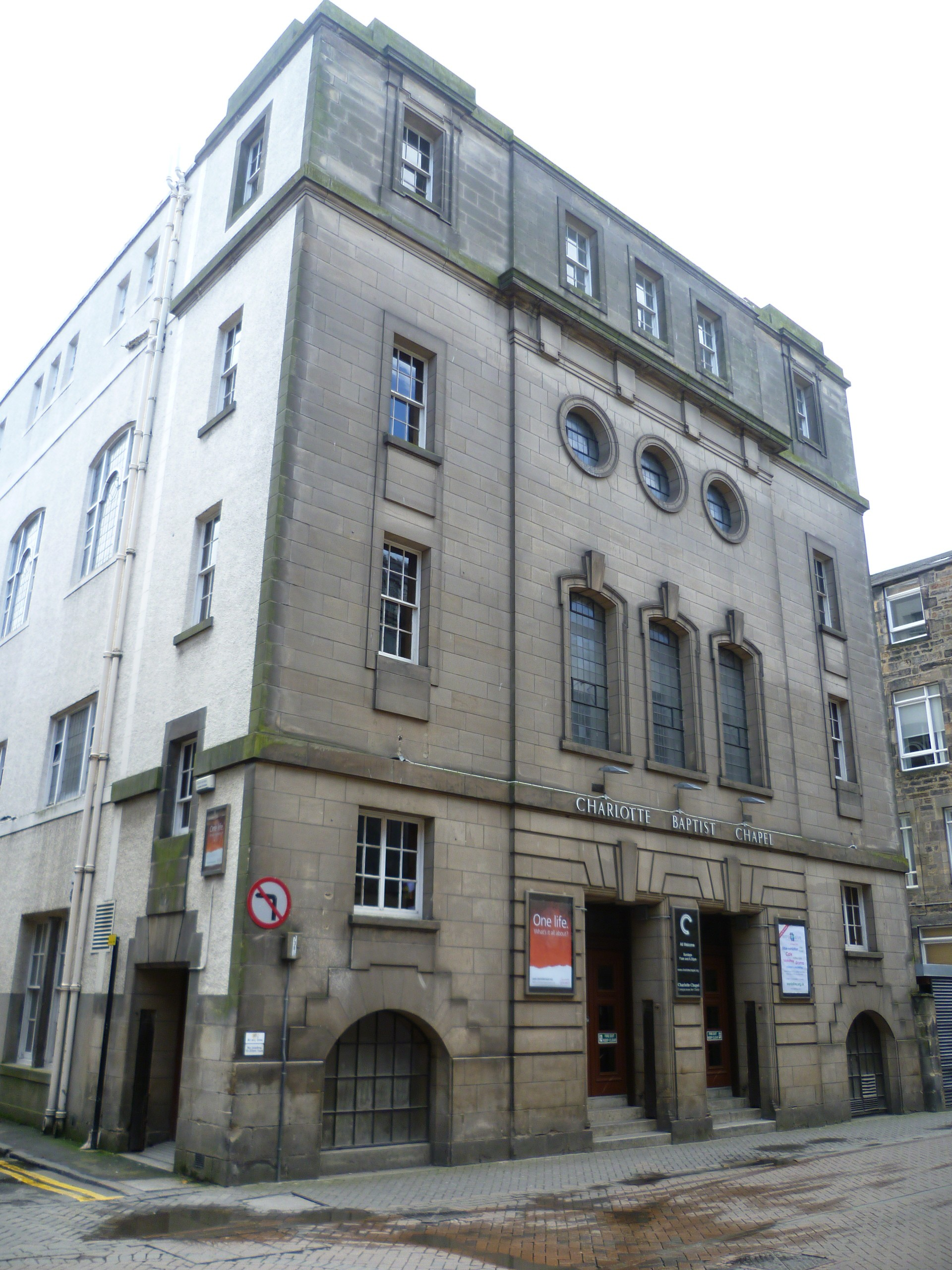
- Exterior of building
- Interactive map of Rose Theatre
- Address: 204 Rose Street; Edinburgh, Scotland; United Kingdom
- Coordinates: 55.9512°N 3.2055°W
- Capacity: 300 (main hall), 150 (cabaret cafe/bar), 130 (basement), 50 (attic studios)
- Current use: Theatre, music, drama, dance, musical and comedy venue

Construction
- Opened: 1912 (as Charlotte Chapel)
- Reopened: 2017 (as Rose Theatre)
- Architects: J A Arnott and J Inch Morrison

The Rose Theatre, a Category B listed building on Rose Street, Edinburgh, Scotland, is a former Baptist chapel and, more recently, arts & entertainment venue. Following deconsecration, the building re-opened in 2017 to provide year-round venues for the performing arts, hosting events for the Edinburgh Festival Fringe on a number of occasions.

== History ==
The building, originally designed by architects J A Arnott & J Inch Morrison, opened as a Baptist chapel in 1912, with seating for exactly 1,000 people. It was built on the site of an earlier pedimented 18th century chapel at a cost of £7,250 for a long-standing Baptist congregation which had been established by theologian Christopher Anderson in January 1808. The building was listed on 28 March 1996.

In 2016, the congregation moved to the former St George's West Church of Scotland building in Shandwick Place, as the chapel was no longer fit for the congregation's needs, leaving the Rose Street Chapel largely abandoned.

After conversion of the building to use as a theatre and performing arts centre by the previous owner, the 'Rose Street Theatre', which opened in 2017, hosted a number of comedy and theatre performances for the Edinburgh Festival Fringe, and operated on an occasional basis throughout the year. It was also home on the ground floor to the Rose Theatre Café from 2018.

The converted building currently features 4 distinct performance spaces, including a two storey, triple height 300 seat amphitheatre main hall with standing room, a ground floor cabaret bar and café (150 standing capacity), a basement space (130 standing) and attic spaces for niche performances and studios (50).

The venue has been under new ownership since mid-2024 and is currently undergoing refurbishment.

== Design ==
The building is a four storey, five bay stripped Wrenaissance chapel and meeting halls, built of polished sandstone ashlar, with harled secondary elevations.
