= Grand Edinburgh Adventuring Society =

Role-playing society at the University of Edinburgh

- Abbreviation: GEAS
- Formation: 1978
- Location: Edinburgh
- Members: ~40
- Website: http://www.geas.org.uk

GEAS (Grand Edinburgh Adventuring Society, also known as GEAS Roleplaying Society or Edinburgh University Roleplaying Society) is the roleplaying society of the University of Edinburgh. The society plays host annually to Conpulsion, Scotland's oldest, largest gaming convention.

== History ==
GEAS was founded in 1978 with a stated goal of "[fostering] the cause of all roleplaying games." It gained a website in the early days of the Web (1993/1994), which by 1997 was reputedly "Europe's most popular roleplaying website", and accounted for almost half the web traffic of the University of Edinburgh. By the time the GEAS Village (as it was known then) closed, sometime in September 2001, it had been the largest independent roleplaying website in the world, primarily due to its use of then-cutting edge technology in combining graphics, archives of roleplaying material, and some of the world's first internet message boards.

In 1987, GEAS ran a convention titled Dungeon Aid to raise money for charity. The event proved very popular so became an annual fixture, renamed Big Con after a few years, then Conpulsion in 1995.
