= Teviot Row House =

Students' union building in Edinburgh, Scotland

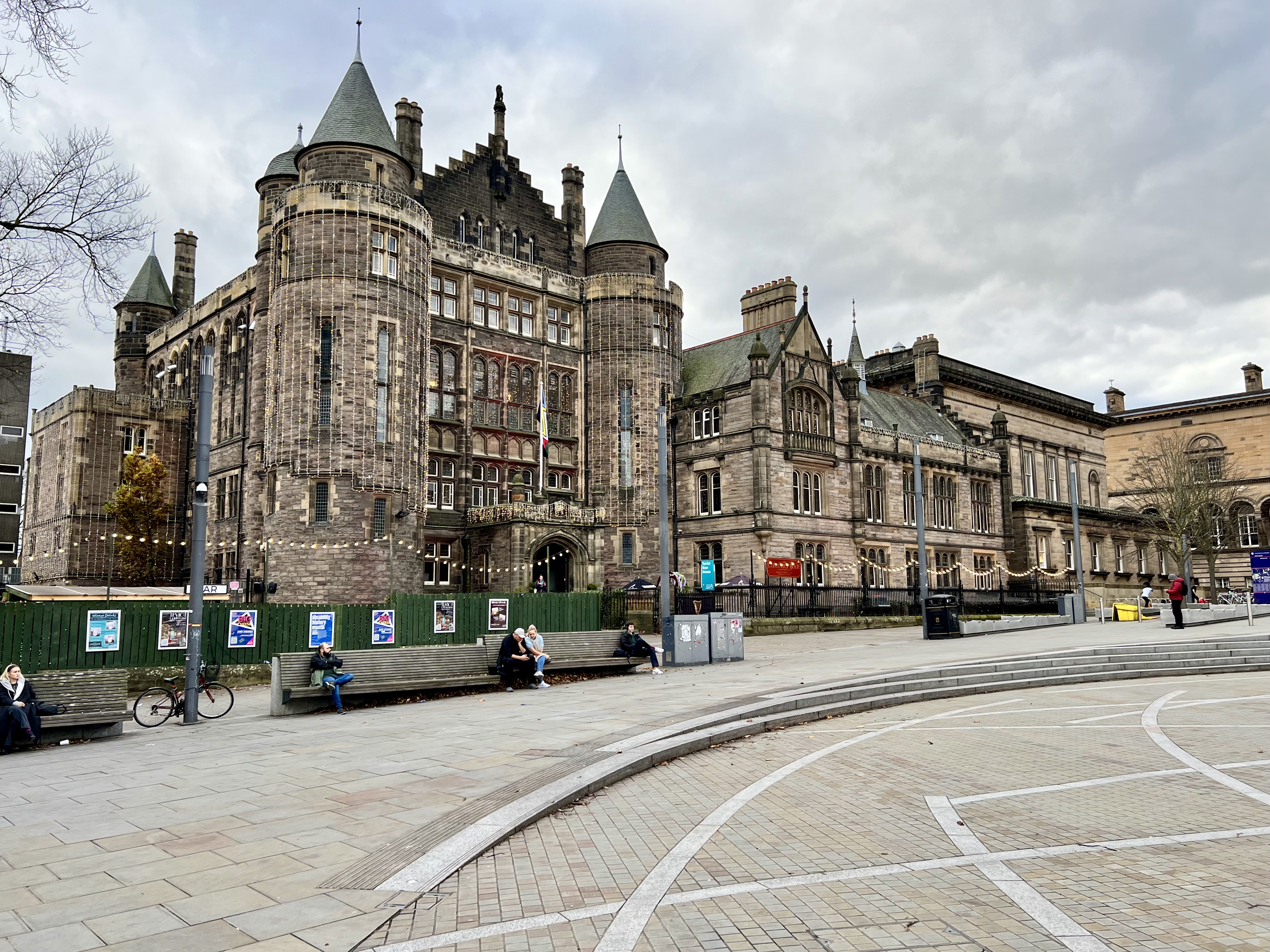
- Teviot Row House, viewed from Bristo Square.
- Interactive map of the Teviot Row House area
- Former names: Edinburgh University Union

General information
- Type: Students' union
- Architectural style: Scottish baronial
- Location: Edinburgh, Scotland
- Coordinates: 55°56′42.18″N 3°11′20.33″W
- Construction started: 1887
- Opened: 19 October 1889
- Cost: £15,600
- Owner: The University of Edinburgh
- Landlord: Edinburgh University Students' Association

Technical details
- Floor area: 6,190 m^{2} (66,600 sq ft)

Design and construction
- Architect: Sydney Mitchell
- Architecture firm: Sydney Mitchell and Wilson

Website
- eusa.ed.ac.uk

Listed Building – Category B
- Designated: 13 December 1970
- Reference no.: LB27998

Teviot Row House, or Teviot (/ˈtiːviət/), is one of the student union buildings at the University of Edinburgh, Scotland. Run by Edinburgh University Students' Association (EUSA), the building in Bristo Square is the oldest purpose built student union building in the world, having been opened in 1889.

== Facilities ==
Teviot has six bars, including The Library Bar serving food à la carte; The New Amphion café and bar with counter meals alongside meals à la carte; The Underground nightclub; the union's original single bar, The Lounge Bar; The Loft Bar, complete with a roof terrace; and The Sports Bar with live sport and billiard tables. Other rooms include The Debating Hall, The Dining Room and The Study, alongside several smaller meeting rooms available to student societies. In 2014 the privately operated Teviot Print Shop was opened in the reception area.

== Activities ==
During the university period Teviot hosts a number of regular events catered towards local students. These include Open Mic Nights, Monday Night Jazz, club nights and a popular Sunday night Teviot Pursuits pub quiz. Special one-off annual events using the entire building include a Christmas party, the Graduation Ball, and a Hallowe'en party. The building also plays host to EUSA's regular democratic meetings and student society events.

During the Edinburgh Festival, the building is used by the Gilded Balloon and is one of the city's largest Fringe venues. It was formerly the venue for the Fringe Club, and in modern times is configured to create eight performance spaces, eight bars, and a café.

== Architecture ==
Teviot was built in Hailes sandstone in a 16th-century Scots palace style with a coped crowstepped and pinnacled gables clasped by drum towers of the Falkland or Holyrood type but with large windows. It features large late Gothic traceried windows. In 1905 the 16th-century style west wing, containing the dining hall, library bar and sports bar, was completed in squared coursed sandstone rubble with ashlar dressings. In 1962 a Modernist style extension was added to the rear, containing the study and the billiards room. Prior to construction the site housed Lord Ross's house, built c. 1740, which later became a lying-in hospital from 1793 to 1842.

== Gallery ==
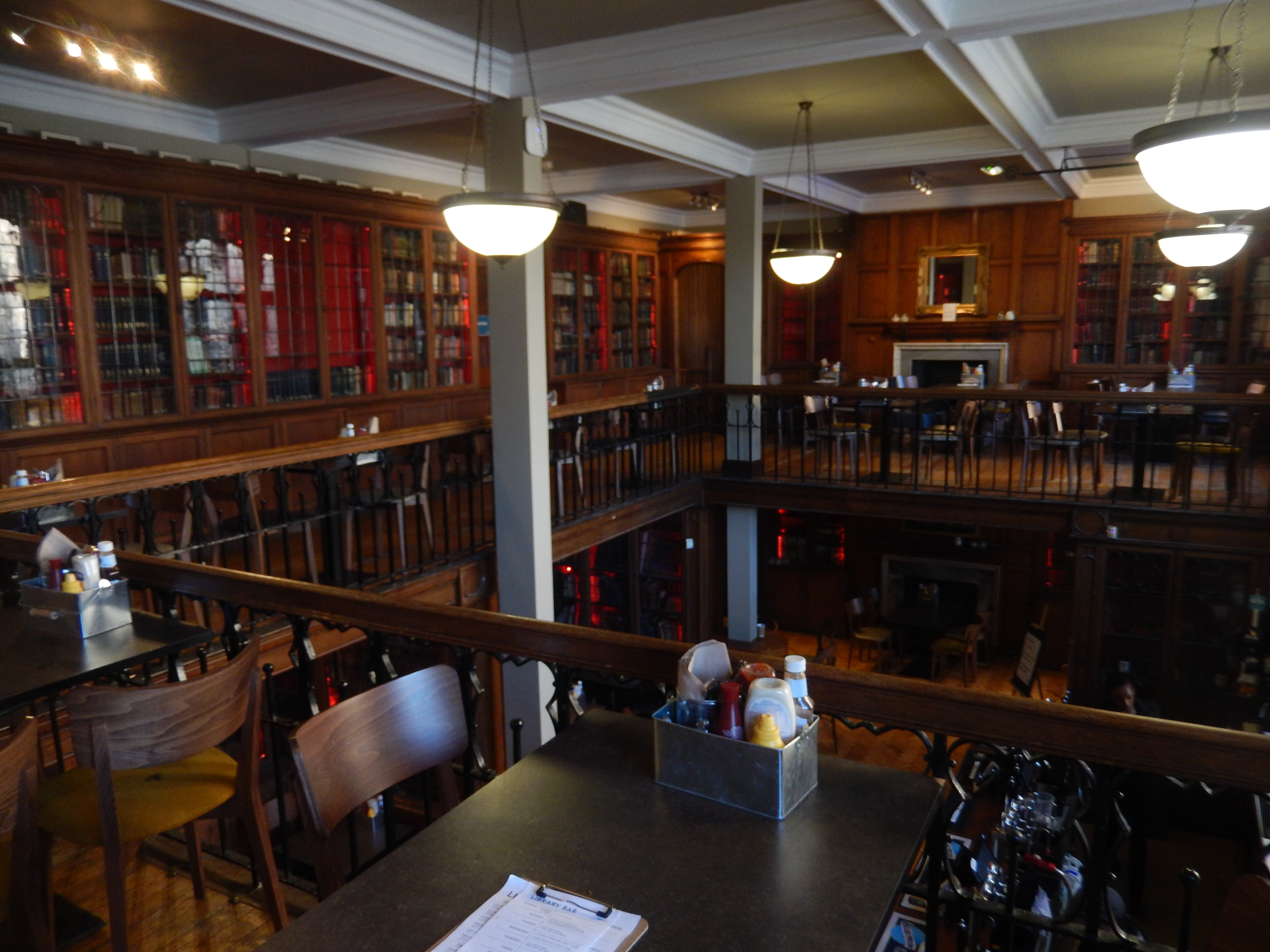
The Library Bar

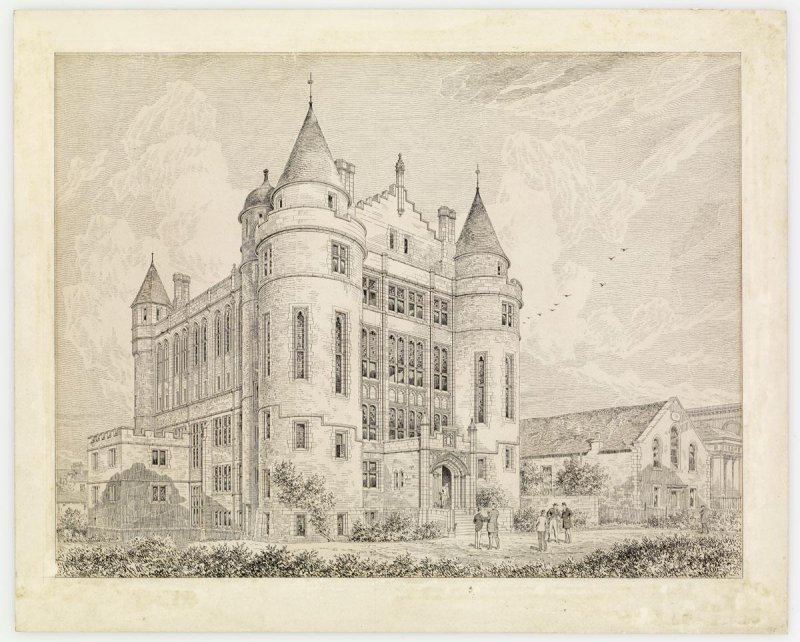
c.1888 drawing by architect Sydney Mitchell

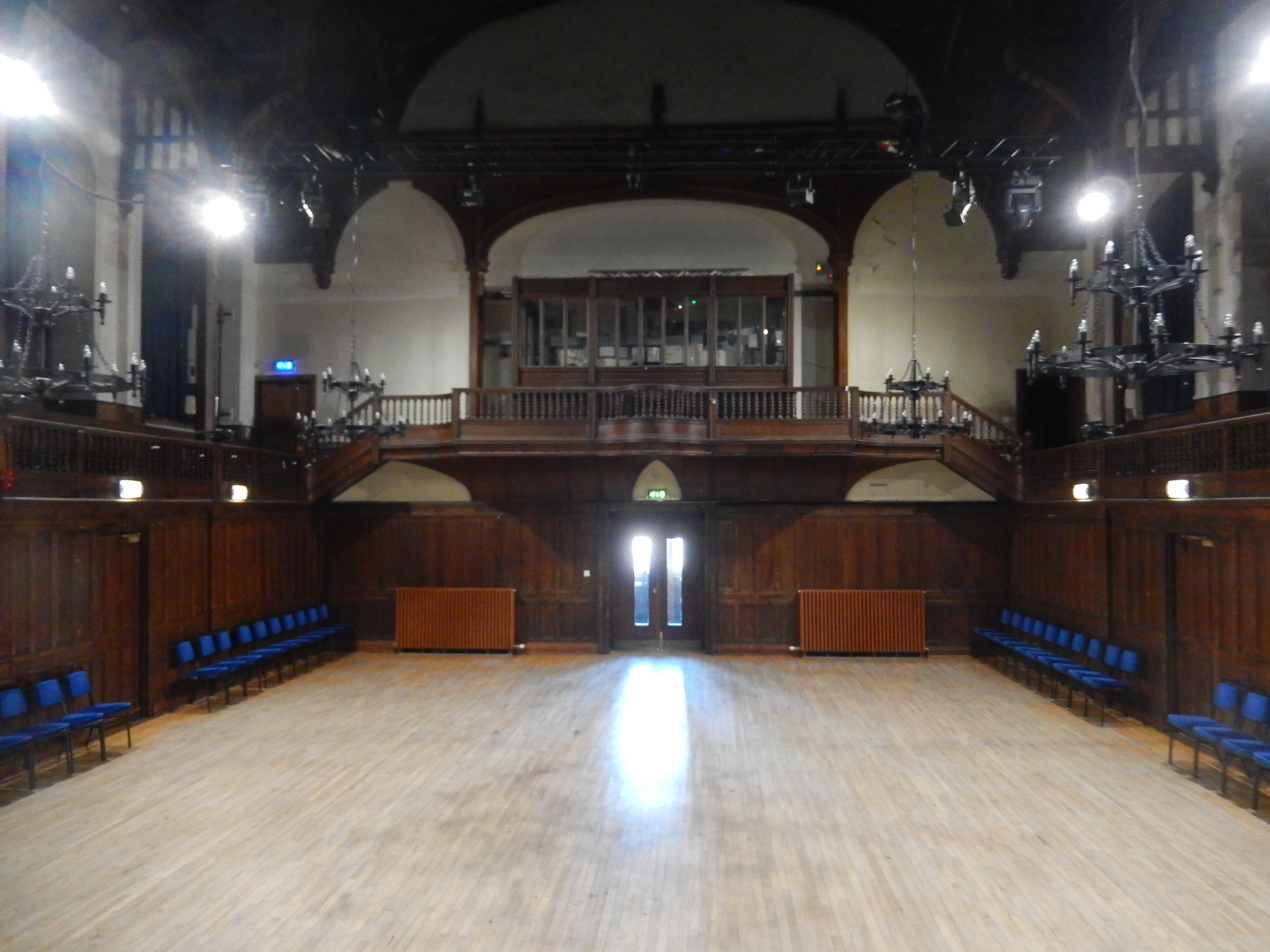
The Debating Hall

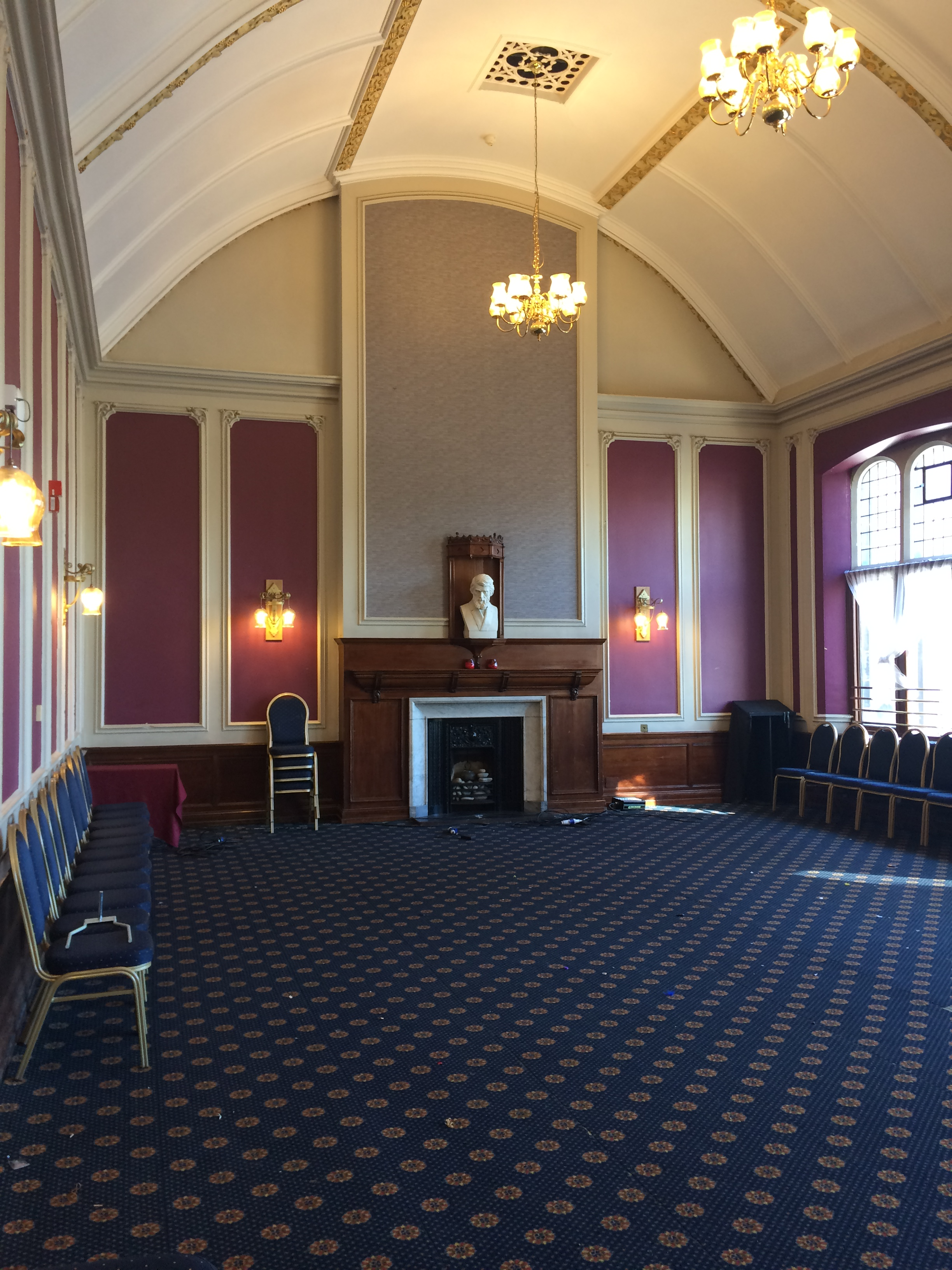
The Dining Room

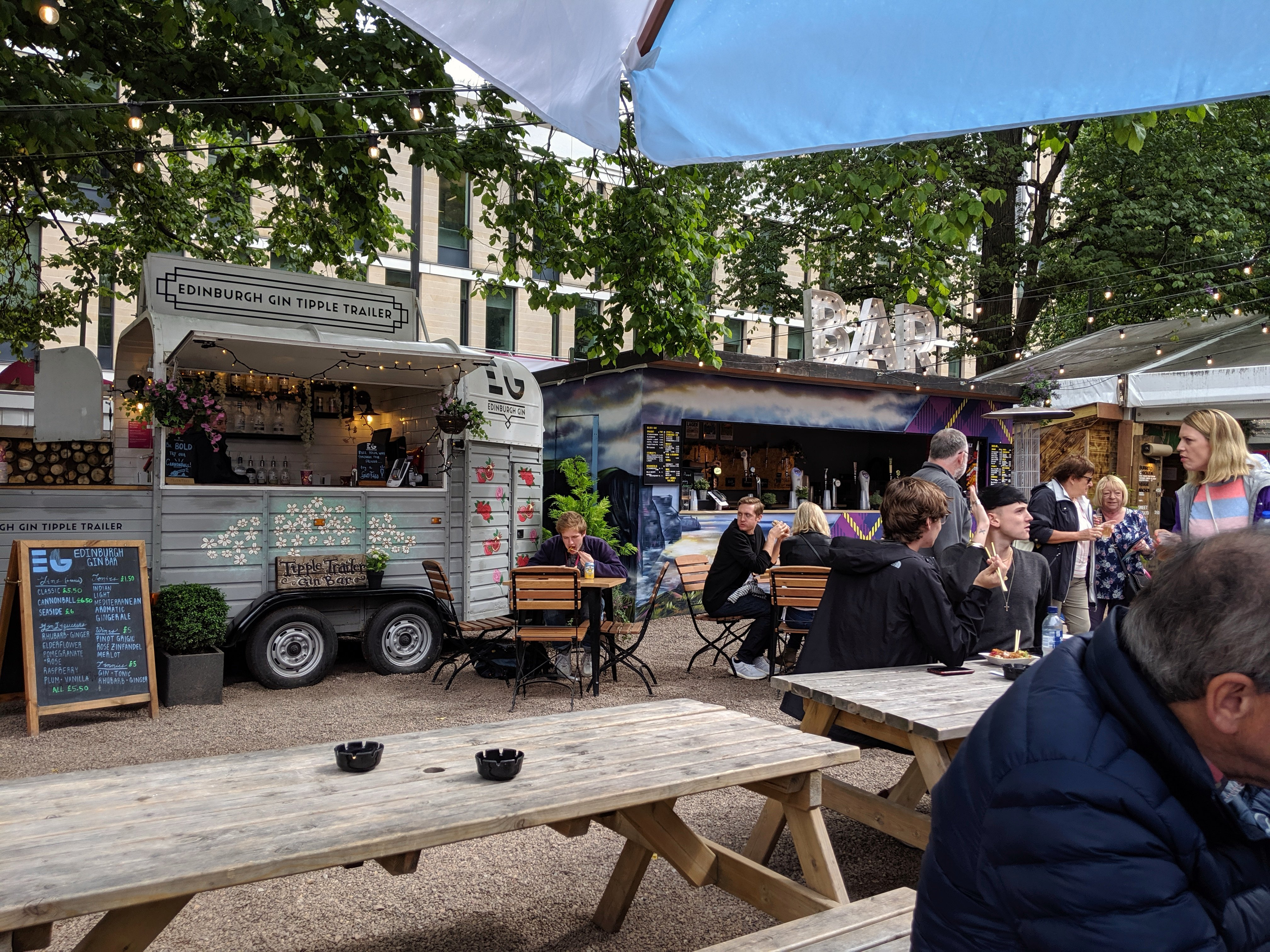
The Garden at Teviot, 2019 Fringe Festival

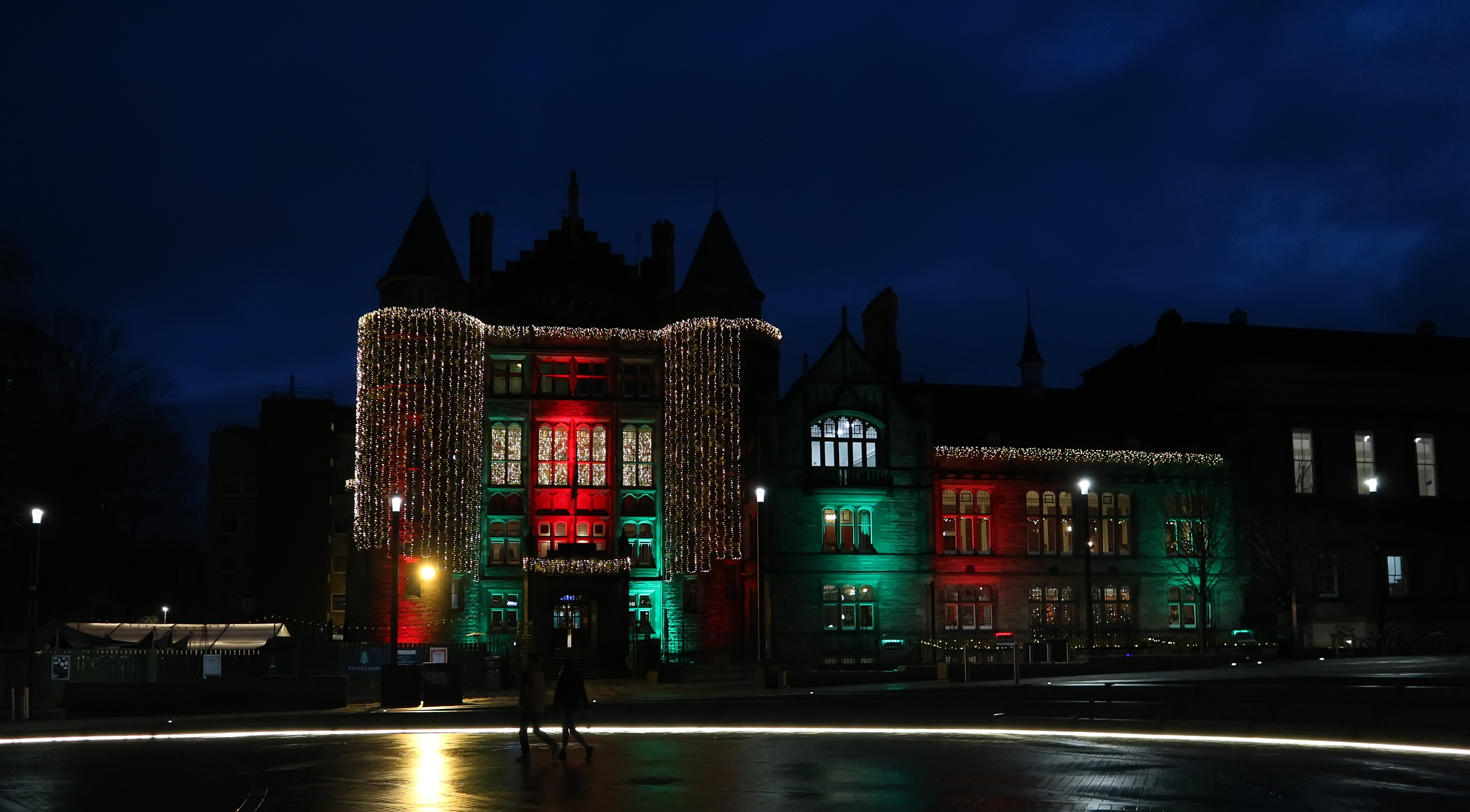
Teviot Row House at night

== See also ==
- Edinburgh University Students' Association
- Potterrow
