= Bristo Square =

Square in Edinburgh, Scotland

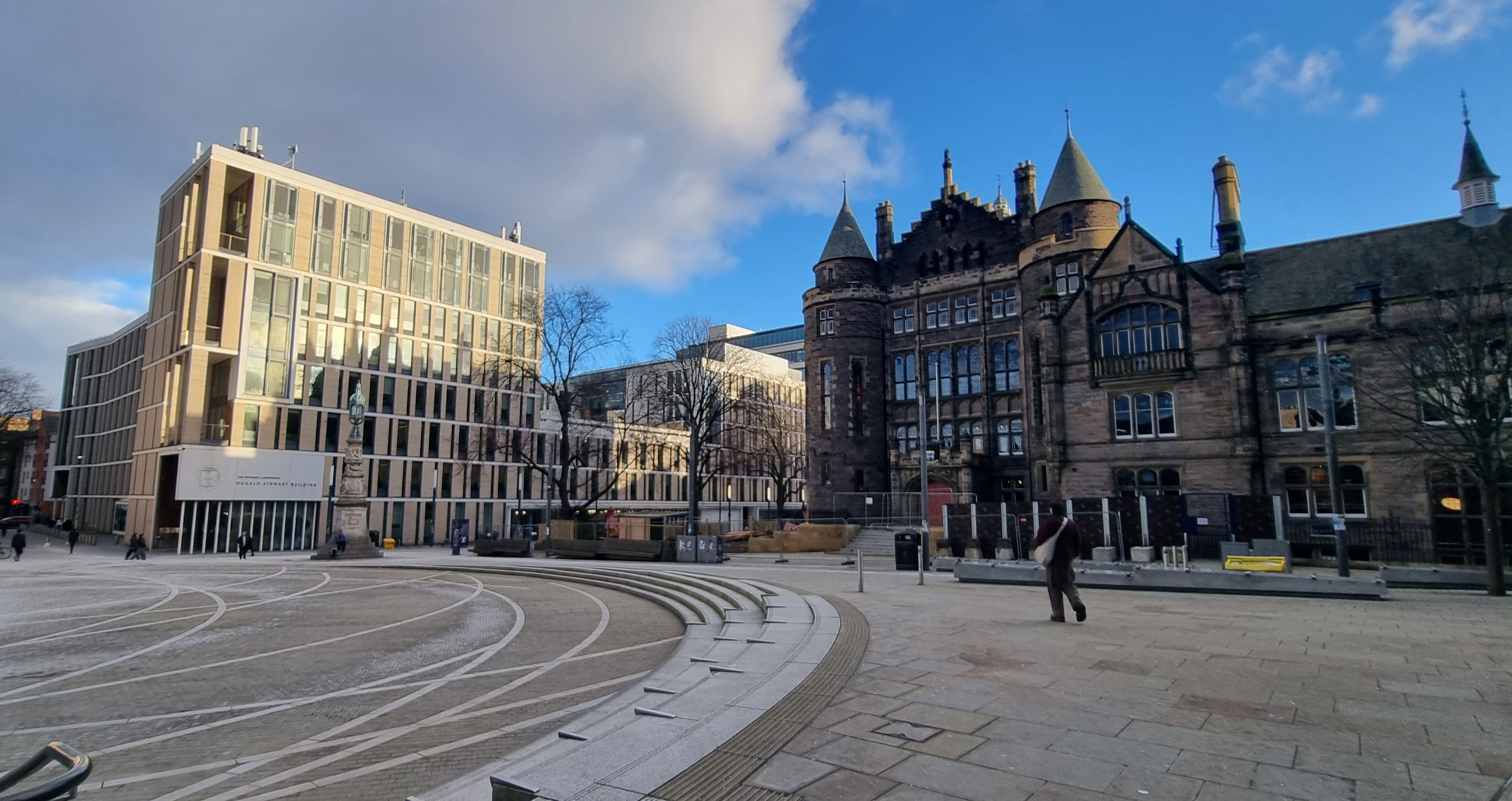
- The square in 2026

- Location within Edinburgh
- Namesake: The former Bristo Street
- Location: Edinburgh, Scotland
- Postal code: EH1
- Coordinates: 55°56′42″N 3°11′22″W
- North: George IV Bridge
- East: Southside
- South: George Square; The Meadows
- West: Greyfriars Kirkyard

Bristo Square is a public space on the estate of the University of Edinburgh, Scotland. It lies in the south of the city, between George IV Bridge and George Square. It is named after the area's former thoroughfare, Bristo Street, which the square replaced.

The most prominent landmark on the square is the category A listed McEwan Hall, in which the university holds its graduation ceremonies. Other notable buildings on the square include the Dugald Stewart Building, the Informatics Forum, Potterrow Student Centre, Reid Concert Hall, and Teviot Row House.

== History ==
The square officially opened in 1983 to mark the university's quartercentenary. The square was designed by the architectural practice headed by Professor Percy Johnson-Marshall (1915–1993) who held the chair of urban design and regional planning at the university. It was originally designed as part of the 1962 plan to create a civic space to replace Bristo Street, realigning Potterrow and Lothian Street in the process. The consulting engineers were Jamieson, MacKay & Partners.

There is a plaque to the local educational campaigner Mary Crudelius in Bristo Square.

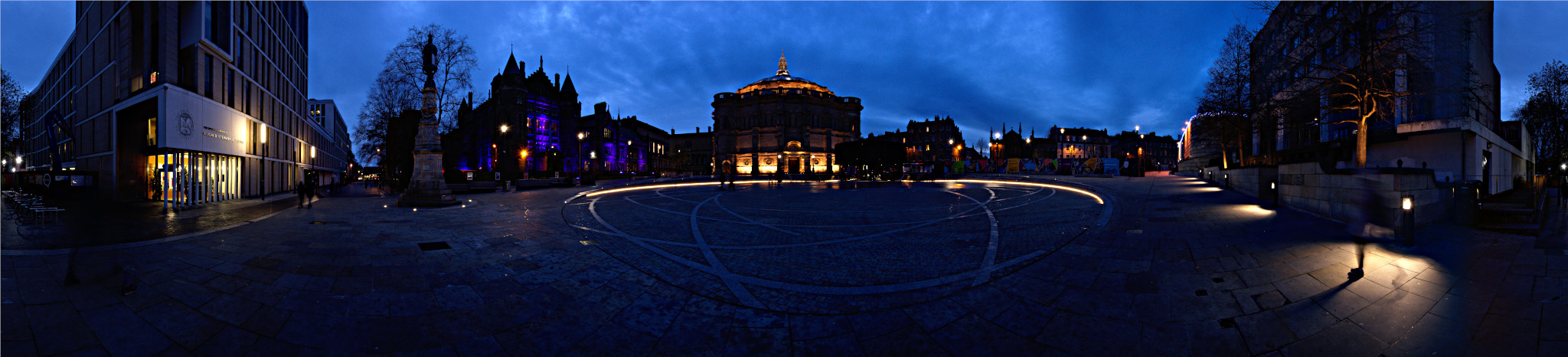
Panorama of Bristo Square, November 2017

== Redevelopment ==
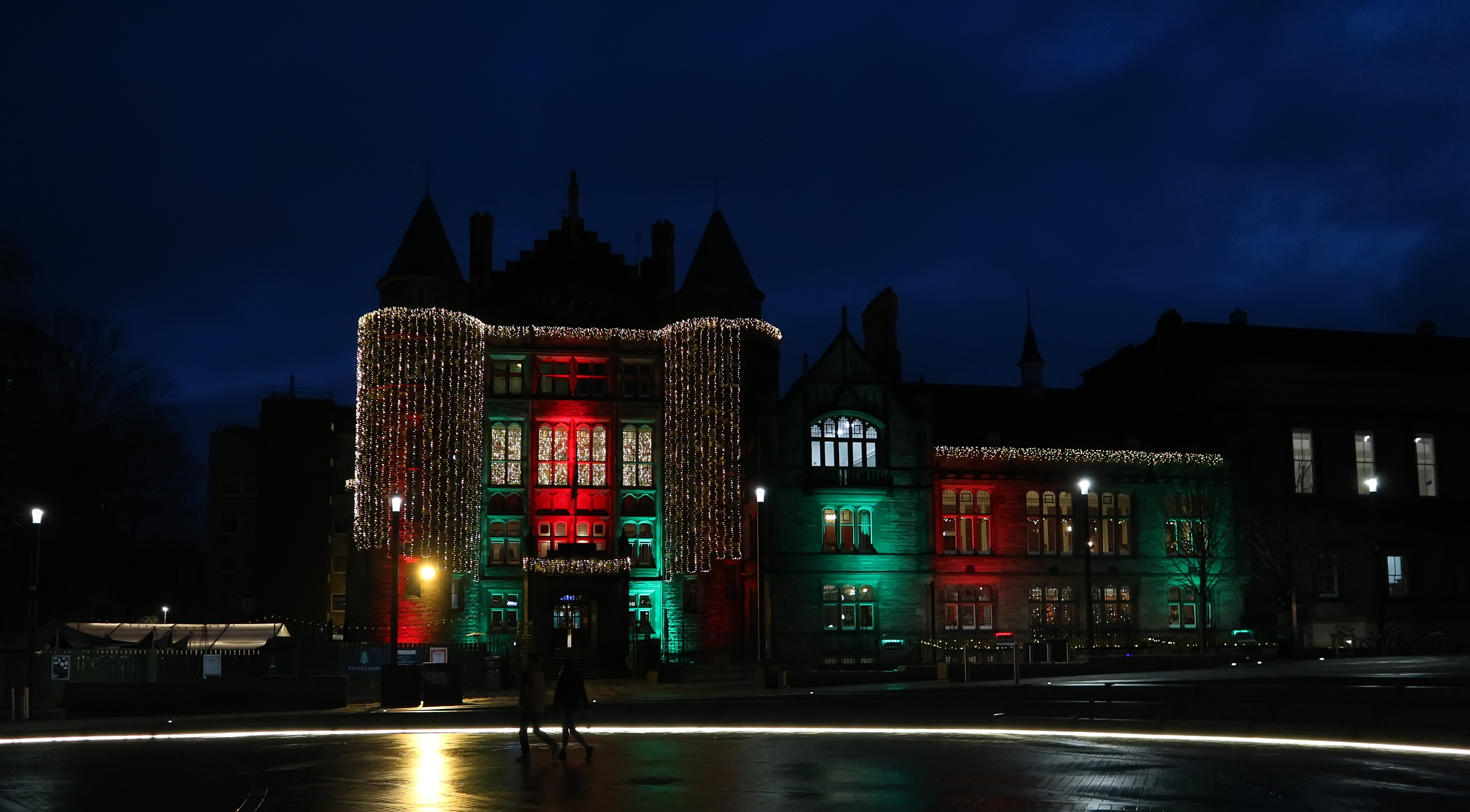
Teviot at Christmas

In 2013 the University of Edinburgh announced plans to invest £35M on improvements to the McEwan Hall and the Bristo Square area. Designed by LDN and Buro Happold this scheme is designed to restore the A listed Robert Rowan Anderson building to its former glory whilst enhancing accessibility and increasing capacity by adding in basement seminar rooms. The redevelopment of this square started in April 2015 and was completed in time for the July 2017 graduations.

As part of the redevelopment, a new artwork "The Next Big Thing...is a Series of Little Things", by Susan Collis has been installed by Powderhall Bronze Foundry. The artwork takes the form of a series of bronze circular shapes which runs as a series of drips from McEwan Hall entrance across the square.

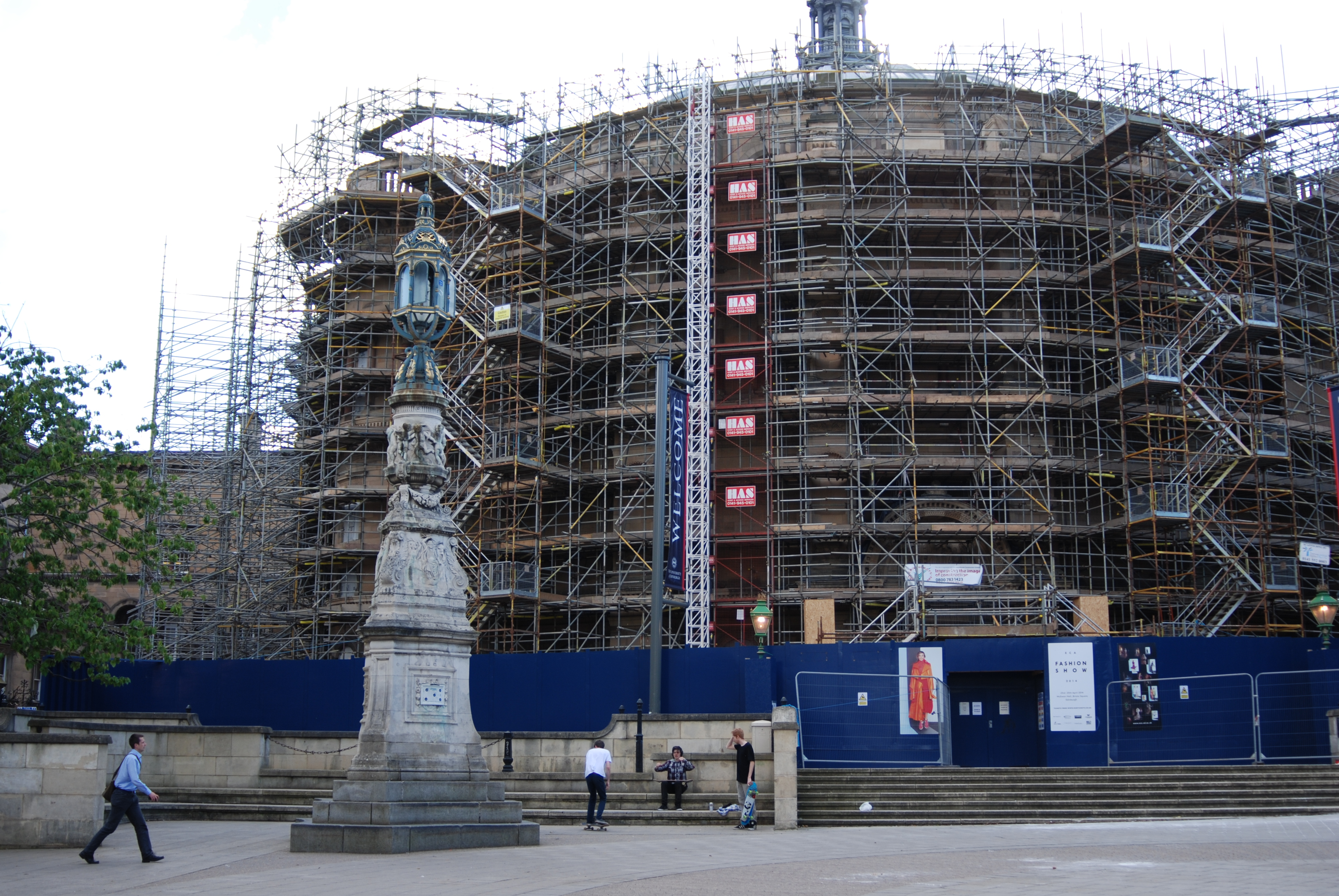
Bristo Square prior to redevelopment

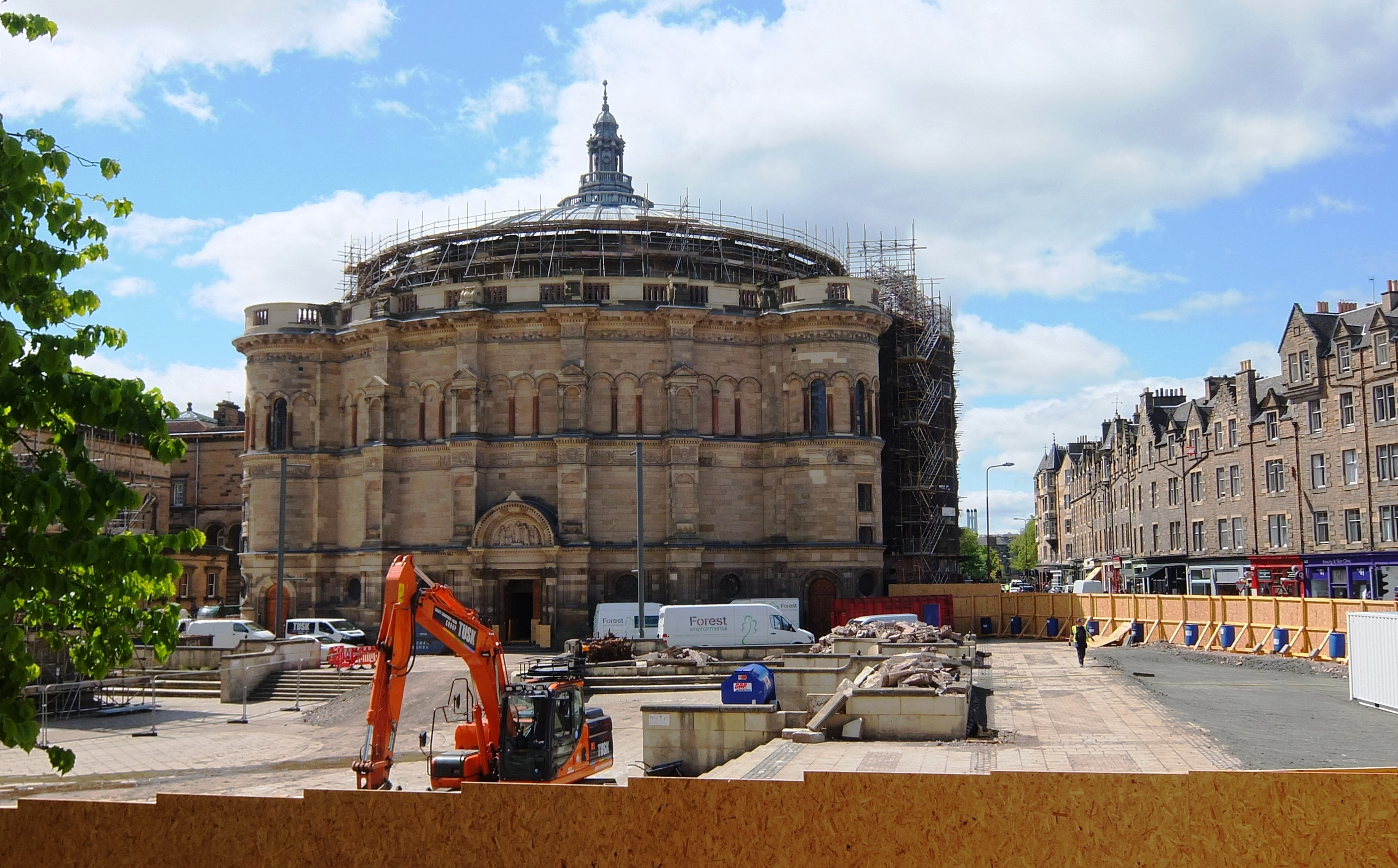
Bristo Square redevelopment underway May 2015

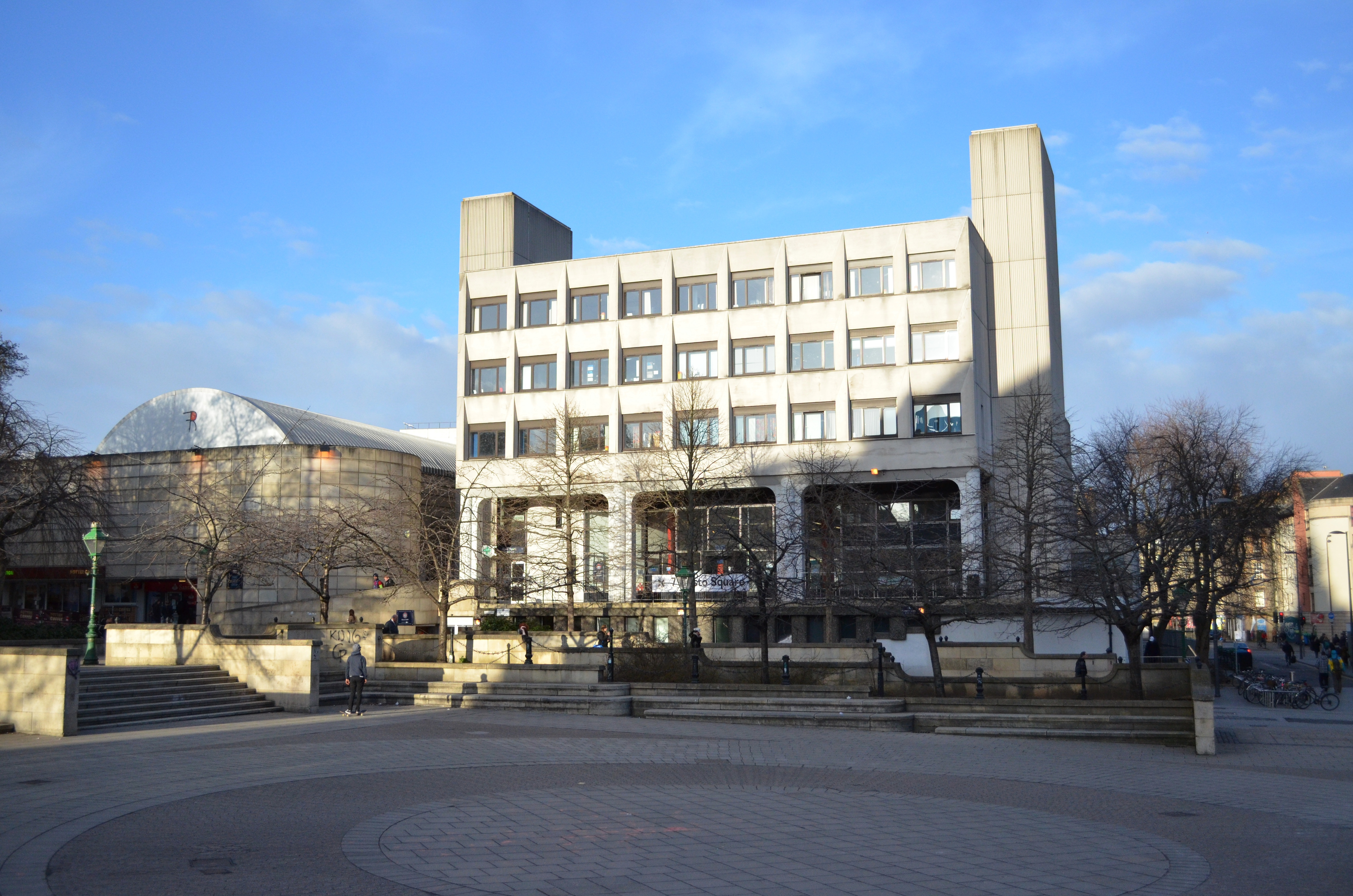
Bristo Square prior to the 2015 redevelopment work. This view shows 7 Bristo Square by the Modernist architects Robert Steedman (b. 1929) and James Morris (1931-2006).

== Recreational and Edinburgh Festival Fringe use ==
The square is frequently used by traceurs, skateboarders, rollerbladers and bmxers for recreational purposes. It has been said to be a “breeding ground for skaters”, however with the redevelopment work this ceased at the end of March 2015 until the square reopened in summer 2017.

It had become customary over the summer months for University of Edinburgh to rent the square to the Edinburgh Festival Fringe for shows and stages. The square was home to the udderBELLY for the several years until 2014. The Udderbelly purple cow tent has since moved to the university's George Square gardens.
