= School of Engineering, University of Edinburgh =

Engineering faculty of the University of Edinburgh

School of Engineering
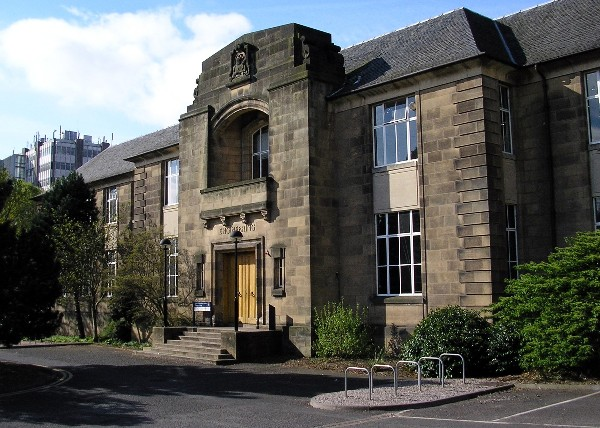
- Sanderson Building
- Parent institution: University of Edinburgh College of Science and Engineering
- Head of School: Guangzhao Mao
- Location: Edinburgh, United Kingdom
- Website: www.eng.ed.ac.uk

The School of Engineering is an academic department within the College of Science and Engineering at the University of Edinburgh in Scotland.

== History ==
Engineering and its underpinning applied mathematics, chemistry and natural philosophy has been taught and practiced at the University since at least the 1600s. During this period and particularly during the early-to-mid-19th century many renowned engineers were educated at the University, notably the Stevenson family of lighthouse engineers (including acclaimed novelist Robert Louis Stevenson), John Rennie, the canal and bridge pioneer, and Robert Stephenson, inventor of the Rocket locomotive.

Engineering gained a formal footing with the establishment of the Regius Professor of Engineering in 1868. Selected ahead of the acclaimed William Rankine, the first incumbent was Henry Charles Fleeming Jenkin, an accomplished telegraph engineer and contemporary of Lord Kelvin. Fleeming Jenkin established the programme for the new degree of Bachelor of Science in Engineering. The department was part of the Faculty of Arts before joining the newly created Faculty of Science in 1893.

From the start of the 20th century, the third Regius chair Thomas Hudson Beare led the development of the department for almost 40 years. During that time, there was considerable growth in student numbers, development of new facilities and, from 1926, the establishment of separate Honours degrees in civil, mechanical and electrical engineering (chemical engineering followed later). Some of these early developments were undertaken with the Heriot-Watt College (the forerunner of Heriot-Watt University). The arrival of Ronald Arnold in 1946 saw a renewed focus on research alongside teaching, and in the early 1960s, the creation of new facilities, and the establishment of new chairs and separate departments of chemical, civil, electrical and mechanical engineering.

The School has since taken various forms with the establishment of new departments of fire (safety) engineering, as well as various groupings of departments under a School of Engineering Science. For much of the 1990s, the School also incorporated the departments of Computer Science and Artificial Intelligence (it was known as the School of Engineering and Information Technology) prior to the formation of the standalone School of Informatics.

The School took its current form in 2002 and is currently organised into four major disciplines of chemical engineering, civil and environmental engineering, electronics and electrical engineering and mechanical engineering. It is the largest School in the College of Science and Engineering.

Staff and alumni have made major and pioneering contributions across a wide array of fields, notably in civil engineering, lighthouse engineering, railway engineering, thermodynamics, renewable energy, telegraphy, fire safety, electronics and signal processing.

== Research ==
Research is carried out in thematic Research Institutes:

- Institute for Imaging, Data and Communications (IDCoM)
- Institute for Energy Systems (IES)
- Institute for Infrastructure and Environment (IIE)
- Institute for Integrated Micro and Nano Systems (IMNS)
- Institute for Materials and Processes (IMP)
- Institute for Multiscale Thermofluids (IMT)

Since 2005 the School has maintained a formal research collaboration with Heriot-Watt University. The Edinburgh Research Partnership in Engineering has been the focus of joint submissions to recent Research Excellence Framework exercises.

== Location ==
The department has occupied many sites in its history, from facilities in Old College until 1906, to High School Yards (1906-1932) and its current, primary location at King's Buildings in 1932. The move to King’s Buildings was part of a wider effort to provide facilities for the universities scientific departments.

The Sanderson Building was purpose-built following a £50,000 bequest by James Sanderson of R. and A. Sanderson and Co., a Scottish tweed manufacturer based in Galashiels. The building was designed and built by the Scottish architectural partnership of Sir Robert Lorimer and John Fraser Matthew and is ‘Category B’ listed. This has been followed by additional buildings adjacent to the Sanderson Building and elsewhere on the King's Buildings site from the 1960s onwards.

== Notable people ==
=== Regius Chairs of Engineering ===
- Henry Charles Fleeming Jenkin (1868)
- George Frederick Armstrong (1885)
- Sir Thomas Hudson Beare (1901)
- Ronald Nathan Arnold (1946)
- Leslie Gordon Jaeger (1964)
- James Lawrence King (1968)
- Joseph McGeough (1983)
- Peter Mitchell Grant (2007)
- Jason Meredith Reese (2013)
- Themis Prodromakis (2022)

=== Other major chairs ===
- 1955 Chair of Chemical Technology (renamed Chemical Engineering in 1960): Kenneth Denbigh, Philip Calderbank, Ian Metcalfe, Stefano Brandani
- 1961 Chair of Electrical Engineering (renamed Bert Whittington Chair of Electrical Engineering in 2002): Ewart Farvis, Jeffrey Collins, John Mavor, Janusz Bialek, Gareth Harrison
- 1964 Chair of Civil Engineering: Arnold W. Hendry, Michael Rotter
- 1972 Chair of Fire Safety Engineering: Dougal Drysdale, Jose Torero, Grunde Jomass
- 1979 Chair of Microelectronics: John Mavor, John Robertson
- 1997 Chair of Environmental Engineering: David Andrew Barry, Andrea Schaeffer, Paolo Peroni, Lindsay Beevers
- Full list of Established (Substantive) and Personal Chairs

=== Other notable alumni and staff ===
Alumni and staff include Fellows of the Royal Society, Royal Society of Edinburgh and Royal Academy of Engineering as well as inductees of the Scottish Engineering Hall of Fame.

- Dorothy Buchanan, first female member of the Institution of Civil Engineers and co-designer of Sydney Harbour Bridge.
- Peter Denyer, pioneer of CMOS image sensor chips
- Sir James Alfred Ewing, engineer and cryptographer, coined the term ‘hysteresis’, former Principal and Vice Chancellor (1916- 1929) of the University of Edinburgh
- Harald Haas, Van Eck Professor of Engineering, University of Cambridge; and inventor of LiFi
- Molly Ferguson, first woman to graduate with honours in engineering from the University of Edinburgh and first female Fellow of the ICE
- Charles Frewen Jenkin, son of Fleeming Jenkin and first Professor of Engineering Science at the University of Oxford
- Sir John Jackson, civil engineer and contractor who constructed the Manchester Ship Canal
- Elijah McCoy, son of a fugitive slave and prolific inventor
- Sir Duncan Michael, co-designer of the Sydney Opera House and former chairman of ARUP
- David Milne (technologist), founder of Wolfson Microelectronics
- Sir Alexander Moncrieff (1820–1906), Military engineer.
- George Parker Bidder, railway engineer and former President of the Institution of Civil Engineers
- William Rankine, Regius Professor of Civil Engineering and Mechanics at Glasgow University and founder of thermodynamics
- Frank Rushbrook, fire safety expert
- Stephen Salter, wave power pioneer
- Robert Stephenson, pioneering railway and locomotive engineer
- Robert Stevenson, lighthouse engineer
- Robert Louis Stevenson (1850–1894), author.
- Robert Stirling (1790–1878), inventor of the Stirling engine.
- Xia Peisu, Chinese computer scientist and “The mother of Computer Science in China”
