= Guangzhao =

Guangzhao may refer to:

- Zheng Guangzhao (born 1966), Chinese politician
- Zhou Guangzhao (1929– 2024), Chinese theoretical physicist
- Guangzhao Mao, American chemical engineer
- Guangzhao Dam, dam in China
- Guangzhou–Zhaoqing intercity railway, abbreviated as Guangzhao ICR

== See also ==
- Guangzhou
