= School of Mathematics, University of Edinburgh =

Maths department of the University of Edinburgh

School of Mathematics
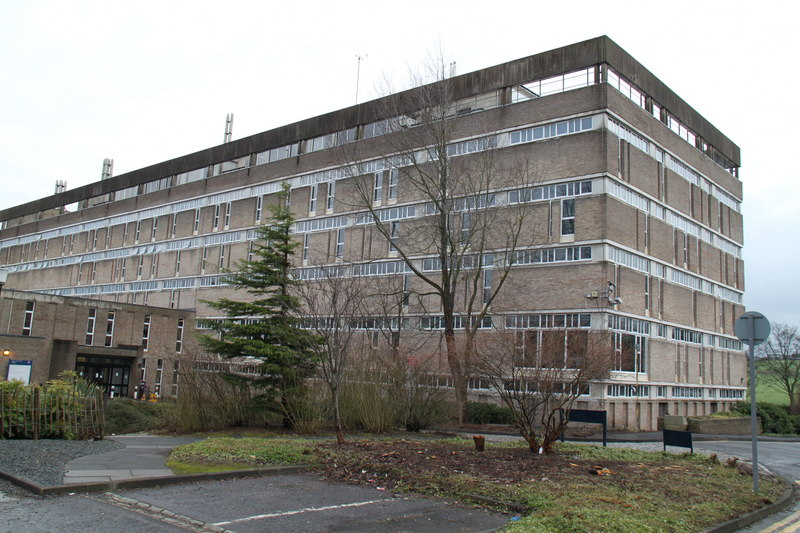
- Parent institution: University of Edinburgh College of Science and Engineering
- Head of School: Bernd Schroers
- Location: Edinburgh, United Kingdom
- Website: www.maths.ed.ac.uk

The School of Mathematics is an academic department within the College of Science and Engineering at the University of Edinburgh in Scotland.

== History ==
The teaching of mathematics at Edinburgh been carried out since the formation of the university in 1583 and was part of the core teaching alongside logic, philosophy and natural philosophy.

The chair in mathematics was formally established in 1674, and the first incumbent was James Gregory. Two of his nephews also held the chair as well as other major figures in mathematics, including Colin Maclaurin and Sir Edmund Whittaker with contributions ranging from pure mathematics to the mathematical underpinnings of physics and engineering. A number of the chairs in Mathematics during the period of the Scottish Enlightenment are notable for moving between mathematics and moral or natural philosophy, including Adam Ferguson, John Playfair, Dugald Stewart and Sir John Leslie. It wasn’t until 1964 that a second chair of mathematics was established in the form of the Maclaurin Chair, which was followed by the chair of statistics in 1966 and the chair of applied mathematics in 1968.

Organisationally, the department of mathematics sat within the Faculty of Arts until 1966 despite the creation of the Faculty of Science in 1893. It joined the then Faculty of Science in 1966 at the same time as the creation of a separate Department of Statistics. The departments merged in 1991 and the school took its current name in 2002.

The department has occupied many sites in its history, from facilities in the central campus at Old College, the Mathematical Institute on Chambers Street from 1914 and its current, primary location at King's Buildings in 1976.

== Research ==
Since 2005 the school has maintained a formal research collaboration with Heriot-Watt University. The Maxwell Institute for Mathematical Sciences has been the focus of joint submissions to recent Research Excellence Framework exercises.

Research in the school is grouped into several themes:

- Analysis and probability
- Applied and computational mathematics
- Data and decisions
- Structure and symmetry
- Technology enhanced mathematical sciences education
- Energy in maths

== Notable people ==
=== Chairs of Mathematics ===
- James Gregory (1674-1675), trigonometrist and astronomer, Regius Professor of Mathematics at the University of St Andrews (1668-1673)
- David Gregory (1683-1691), Savilian Professor of Astronomy at Oxford (1992-1708), early promoter of Newtonianism
- James Gregory (1692-1742)
- Colin Maclaurin (1742-1746), discoverer of the MacLaurin series
- Matthew Stewart (1746-1775), geometrician
- Dugald Stewart (1775-1785), Chair of Moral Philosophy (1785-1828)
- Adam Ferguson (1785-1805, held jointly with Playfair), Chair of Moral Philosophy (1764-1785)
- John Playfair (1785-1805, held jointly with Ferguson), Chair of Natural Philosophy (1805-1819)
- Sir John Leslie (1805-1819), mathematician and physicist, the first producer of artificial ice, Chair of Natural Philosophy (1819-1833)
- William Wallace (1819-1838), geometrist
- Philip Kelland, chair in mathematics (1838-1879), president of Royal Society of Edinburgh
- George Chrystal, chair in mathematics (1879-1911), algebraist and fluid mechanist
- Sir Edmund Whittaker (1912-1946), pure mathematics and mathematical physics, Copley Medalist
- Alexander Aitken (1946-1965), known for the Aitken's delta-squared process, WW2 cryptologist at Bletchley Park
- Arthur Erdélyi (1965-1977), special functions specialist
- Elmer Rees (1979-2005), algebraist
- Iain Gordon (2006- ), algebraist

=== Other notable figures ===
Alumni and staff include many Fellows of the Royal Society and winners of the major mathematics prizes including the Fields Medal and the Copley Medal.

- Sir Michael Atiyah, Fields Medalist (1966) and Abel Prize (2004)
- Thomas Bayes, known for Bayes' theorem and Bayesian Statistics
- Sir William Hodge, Copley Medalist, formulator of the Hodge conjecture, one of the seven Millennium Prize Problems
- Charles Hutton, mathematician and surveyor, Copley Medalist
- Sir James Ivory, Copley Medalist
- Peter Guthrie Tait, pioneer in topology and thermodynamics
- Arthur Geoffrey Walker, co-developer of the Friedmann–Lemaître–Robertson–Walker metric and Fermi–Walker differentiation
- Joseph Wedderburn, algebraist
