= Rosemary Hutton =

British geophysicist

Rosemary Hutton FInstP FRSE FRAS
- Born: Violet Rosemary Strachan Hutton; 22 October 1925; Dundee, Scotland
- Died: 1 April 2004 (aged 78); St Andrews, Scotland
- Education: Harris Academy
- Alma mater: University of St Andrews; University of London
- Known for: magnetotelluric studies
- Scientific career
- Fields: geophysics
- Institutions: University of Ghana; University of Edinburgh School of GeoSciences
- Thesis: Earth Current Variations in the Equatorial Region (1961)

Violet Rosemary Strachan Hutton FInstP FRSE FRAS (22 October 1925 – 1 April 2004), known to her peers as Rosemary, was a Scottish geophysicist and pioneer of magnetotellurics. Her research focused on the use of electromagnetic methods to determine the electrical conductivity and structure of the Earth's crust, lithosphere and upper mantle, with a particular focus on the African continent and Scotland. She spent over two decades at the University of Edinburgh School of GeoSciences as a researcher and lecturer and was a Fellow of many societies including the American Geophysical Union and The Royal Society of Edinburgh.

== Early years, PhD and time in Africa ==
Hutton was born in Dundee, Scotland on 22 October 1925, where she attended the Harris Academy. In 1948 she graduated with an MA in mathematics and physics from the University of St Andrews and went on to take up a physics lectureship at the University of Ghana in 1954. During her time in Ghana, she registered for a higher degree and in 1961 was awarded a PhD from London University, which at that time was connected with the University of Ghana. Her thesis was entitled, 'Earth Current Variations in the Equatorial Region' and focused on electromagnetic field fluctuations associated with the equatorial electrojet.

Following her PhD Hutton stayed in Africa for 15 years, first moving to Nigeria in 1963, as a senior lecturer in physics at Ahmadu Bello University, Zaria, and later gaining an Associate Professorship position in the Department of Physics at the University of Ibadan. During this time, she taught a range of undergraduate physics courses while continuing to develop her research in the field of geomagnetism, publishing 13 papers in scientific journals. This research attracted worldwide attention and Hutton became widely respected in both the geomagnetic and geophysical communities.

== Move to Edinburgh and teaching ==
Hutton's work in Africa was recognised by Professor Alan Cook FRS, who invited her to join the newly established University of Edinburgh School of GeoSciences. In 1969, Rosemary took up a lectureship at the University where she remained for over two decades, being promoted to senior lecturer in 1973, Reader in 1982 and retiring as an Honorary Fellow in 1991. Over the course of her tenure, Rosemary was influential in developing the teaching of undergraduate geophysics within the University of Edinburgh School of GeoSciences and recruited a number of international doctoral and postdoctoral students. The research group she founded at Edinburgh, established itself at the cutting edge of instrumentation, method, processing and analysis.

== Research and notable projects ==
Hutton's research focused on several different areas. The electrical conductivity structure of the Earth was her primary field of research and led to the development of state-of-the-art magnetotelluric equipment at Edinburgh, which was subsequently sold internationally. She used these instruments to perform geophysical surveys of geothermal regions and continental rift systems, such as the Kenyan Rift Valley, and used the results to infer the tectonic evolution of these areas. One aspect of her work that Rosemary was especially passionate about was the electrical conductivity and tectonics of Scotland, in particular how an anomalous region of high conductivity referred to as the Eskdalemuir anomaly could be linked to the closure of the Iapetus Ocean and greater regional development.

During her time at the University of Edinburgh, Hutton received funding from both national and international research councils to carry out surveys in countries including Italy, Greece, Portugal and Kenya, both for academic and mineral exploratory purposes. In 1986 and 1987, she was a NATO visiting professor at the Instituto di Fisica Terrestre at the University of Padua.

In 1972, Hutton was the principal organizer of the first "Electromagnetic induction in the Earth" workshop, which has continued bi-annually.

== Awards and honours ==
In recognition of her significant contribution to geophysics Hutton received several fellowships: Fellow of the Institute of Physics (1965-1980), Fellow of the Royal Society of Edinburgh (1983), Fellow of the Royal Astronomical Society (1970), Honorary Fellow, University of Edinburgh (1991).

In 1992, The V. R. S. Hutton Symposium: Electromagnetic Studies of the Continents was held as part of the Assembly of the European Geophysical Society, to honour Hutton's significant contribution to the field.

== Later years ==
Hutton's later years were spent at her home in Peebles. On 1 April 2004, she died at St Andrews Memorial Hospital after a brief illness. In her will, she left £20,000 to University of Edinburgh School of GeoSciences to benefit overseas research students studying geophysics.
