= Thomas Hudson Beare =

Australian engineer (1859–1940)

Sir Thomas Hudson Beare FRSE
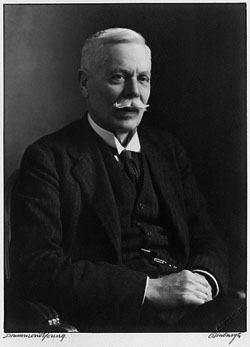
- Born: 30 June 1859; Adelaide, South Australia, Australia
- Died: 10 June 1940 (aged 80); Edinburgh, Scotland
- Occupations: Professor of Engineering at Heriot-Watt University, Edinburgh. Regius Professor of Engineering in Edinburgh University.
- Scientific career
- Fields: Engineering
- Institutions: University of Edinburgh; Heriot-Watt University; University College, London

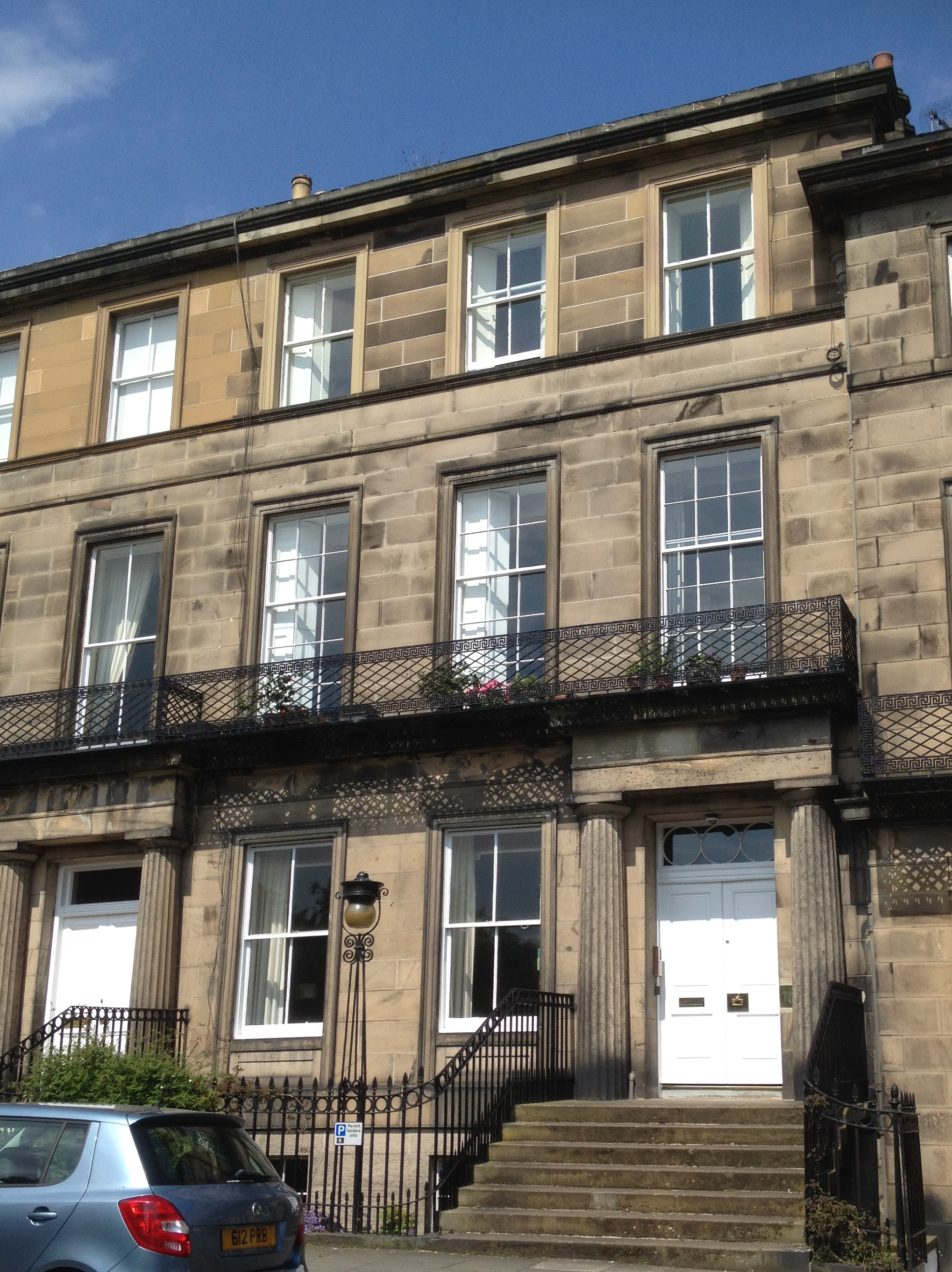
Hudson Beare's house at 10 Regent Terrace, Edinburgh

Sir Thomas Hudson Beare FRSE RSSA (30 June 1859 – 10 June 1940) was a British engineer. He was successively Professor of Engineering at Heriot-Watt University, Edinburgh, at University College, London (where he was a colleague of Karl Pearson), and Regius Professor of Engineering at the University of Edinburgh.

== Life ==
Beare was born in Adelaide, South Australia, the son of Thomas Hudson Beare (c. 1798 – November 1861) of Netley, Hampshire, who arrived in South Australia aboard Duke of York in July 1836 and his second wife Lucy Beare, née Bull (c. 1819 – 15 September 1887), who arrived aboard Canton in May 1838. He was educated at Prince Alfred College and the University of Adelaide, where he was awarded the first South Australian Scholarship, before going to University College London to complete his studies.

In 1884, he joined the staff of University College London, and worked for Professor Alexander Kennedy in various teaching and engineering roles. In 1885, he married Louise Newman.

In 1887, he was appointed to the new chair of mechanics and engineering at Heriot-Watt University, and in two years built up a successful department. He returned to London in 1889, to replace his mentor Professor Kennedy as the chair of engineering at University College and to oversee the building of the new Engineering Department in 1895.

In 1901, Hudson Beare was appointed as the third Regius Professor of Engineering at the University of Edinburgh. He moved to a large townhouse at 10 Regent Terrace on Calton Hill. During his time in Edinburgh he increased the number of engineering students and ensured the department had new and well-equipped facilities. With the influx of new students from around the world to the re-invigorated department, in 1931 he organised its transfer from its site in central Edinburgh to the Sanderson Engineering Laboratories, part of the university's King's Buildings campus. A building in this campus is named in his honour. He worked at the University of Edinburgh until 1940, including 22 years as Dean of the Faculty of Engineering.

In 1908 he was appointed convenor of the university's Military Education Committee, in which capacity he raised the profile and capabilities of the university's Officers' Training Corps. During the World War I he was a captain in the Forth Volunteer Division of the Royal Engineers. He served from 1921 to 1926 as the second Chairman of the Central Organisation of Military Education Committees of the Universities and University Colleges, what is now the Council of Military Education Committees of the Universities of the United Kingdom (COMEC).

He was vice-president of the Royal Society of Edinburgh for two periods: 1909 to 1915, and 1923 to 1926, and was president of the Royal Scottish Society of Arts from 1906 to 1908. In 1921 he was appointed by the Secretary of State for Scotland as an assessor on the Central Miners' Welfare Committee, which he served on until his death.

He was made Deputy Lieutenant of the County of the City of Edinburgh in 1920, and was knighted in 1926. He received an honorary LLD degree from the University of Edinburgh in 1936.

Hudson Beare was a member of the Institution of Civil Engineers, a member and later an honorary life member of the Institution of Mechanical Engineers, and a member and vice-president of the Institution of Structural Engineers.

In his spare time he study of beetles, on which subject he was accepted as an authority by entomologists.

== Works ==
Hudson Beare's talents seem mainly to have been towards academic administration and inspiring younger engineers, but he did publish research that was appreciated at the time: The Building-Stones of Great Britain: their Crushing Strength and other Properties (Minutes of the Proceedings of the Institution of Civil Engineers, vol. 107, p. 341, 1891–2, Part 1) reported the results of his extensive experimental testing in his laboratories at University College London, of different types of rock from around the British Isles, and this was awarded a Telford premium by the Institution of Civil Engineers.

He translated from the Italian, for the benefit of engineering students, Luigi Cremona's Graphical Statics: Two Treatises on the Graphical Calculus and Reciprocal Figures in Graphical Statics (Oxford: Clarendon Press, 1890).

Hudson Beare wrote a number of articles for the Dictionary of National Biography and for the 1911 edition of Encyclopædia Britannica. These are identified in these publications by the initials 'T. H. B.' His contributions to the Dictionary of National Biography include entries on: John Smeaton, George Stephenson, Henry Palfrey Stephenson, Robert Stephenson and William Symington. To the Dictionary of National Biography, 1901 supplement he contributed entries on Joseph Bazalgette, Charles Bright, James Brunlees, John Coode, James Douglass, John Fowler, James Gordon, John Grover, John Hawkshaw, Thomas Hawksley, William Haywood, John Hopkinson, William Lindley and Robert Rawlinson. He wrote the article on Water Motors in the Encyclopædia Britannica Eleventh Edition.

Academic offices
Preceded by George Frederick Armstrong	Regius Professor of Engineering; 1901–1940	Succeeded by Ronald Arnold
