= Guangzhao Mao =

American chemical engineer

- 毛广照
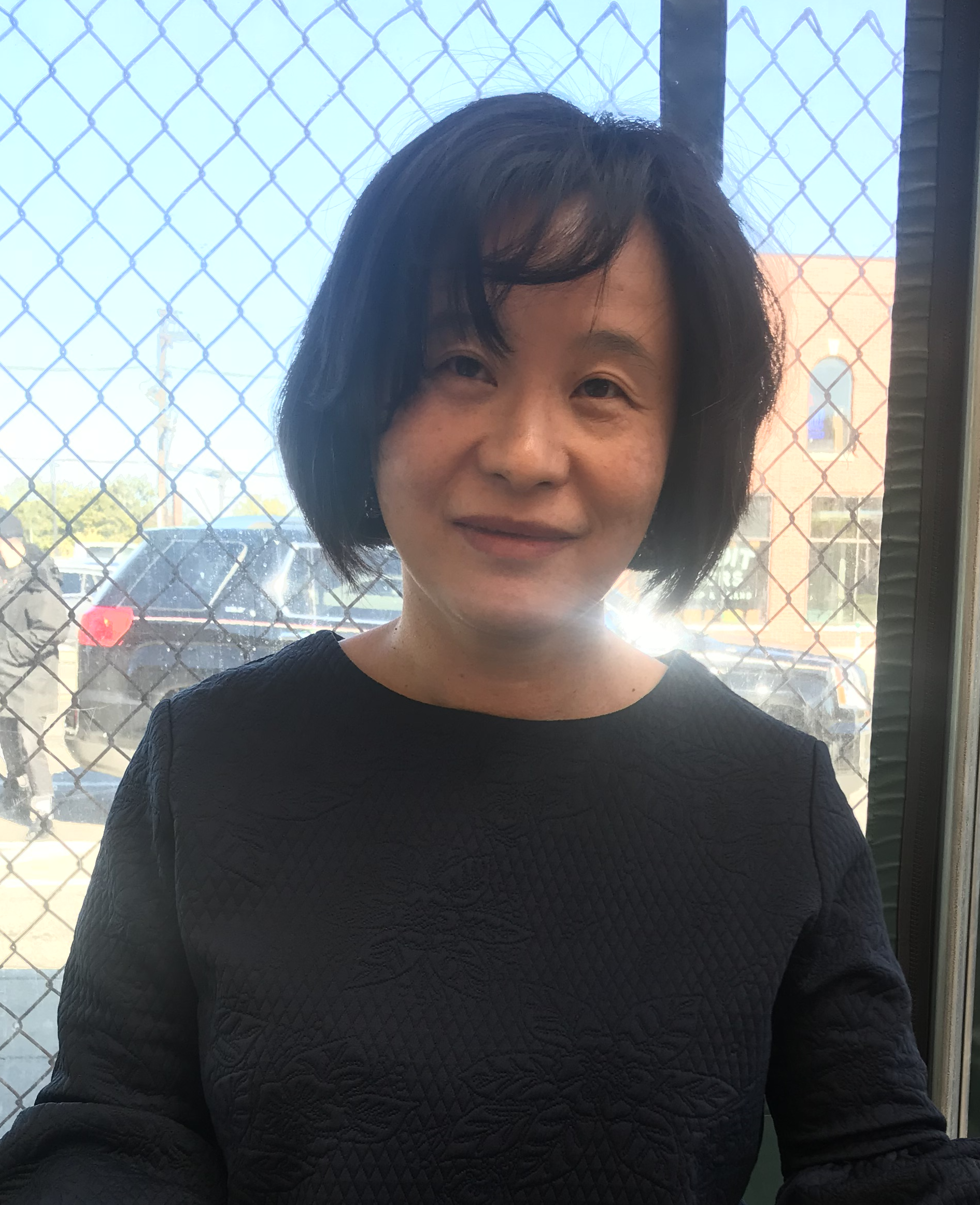
- Education: Nanjing University (BSc); University of Minnesota (PhD)
- Scientific career
- Workplaces: Wayne State University; University of New South Wales; University of Edinburgh

Guangzhao Mao (Chinese: 毛广照) is a chemical engineer who has been serving as head of the School of Engineering at the College of Science and Engineering at the University of Edinburgh since September 2024.

She previously served as head of the School of Chemical Engineering at the University of New South Wales from 2020 to 2024 and as chair of the Department of Chemical Engineering at the Wayne State University College of Engineering from 2015 to 2020.

Her field of research is in nanotechnology, primarily focusing on targeted drug delivery and electrochemistry for sensors.

== Education ==
Mao received a Bachelor of Science with a major in chemistry from Nanjing University in 1988 and a Doctor of Philosophy in chemical engineering from the University of Minnesota in 1994. She then completed a postdoctoral fellowship at the University of Minnesota in 1995.

== Career ==
Mao joined the faculty of the Wayne State University College of Engineering in Detroit, Michigan, as an assistant professor in 1995 and was ultimately promoted to the rank of full professor. At the college's Department of Chemical Engineering and Material Science, Mao served as director of the material science graduate program from 2011 to 2015 and as chair of the department from 2015 to 2020.

She served as head of the School of Chemical Engineering at the University of New South Wales in Australia from 2020 to 2024. She was appointed head of the School of Engineering at the College of Science and Engineering at the University of Edinburgh in Scotland, United Kingdom, in September 2024.

== Awards and honors ==
- 2002 – Fulbright Senior Scholar
- 2022 – Fellow of the American Institute of Chemical Engineers
