= School of Physics and Astronomy, University of Edinburgh =

Physics department of the University of Edinburgh

Coordinates: 55.92174°N 3.17368°W

School of Physics and Astronomy
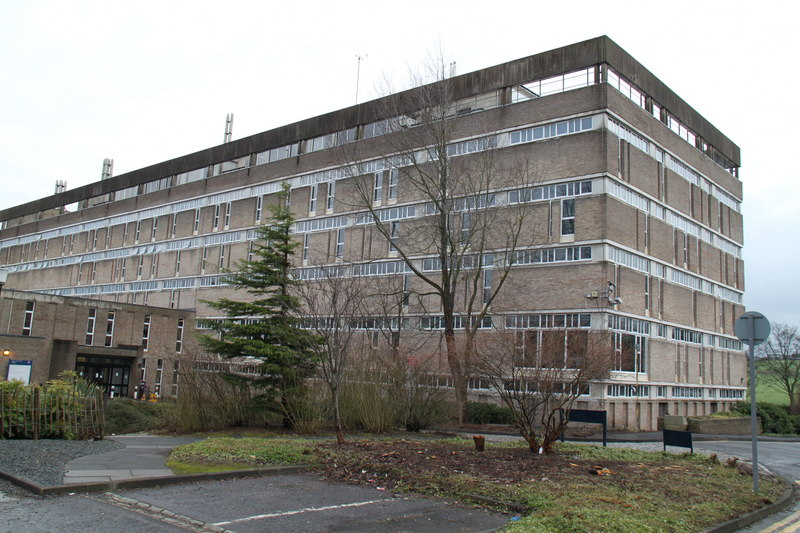
- Parent institution: University of Edinburgh College of Science and Engineering
- Head of Department: Professor Philip Best
- Campus: James Clerk Maxwell Building, King's Buildings, Edinburgh, Scotland
- Website: www.ph.ed.ac.uk

The School of Physics and Astronomy is an academic department within the College of Science and Engineering at the University of Edinburgh in Scotland.

The school was formed in 1993 by a merger of the Department of Physics and the Department of Astronomy, both at the University of Edinburgh. The Department of Physics itself was a merger between the Department of Natural Philosophy and the Department of Mathematical Physics in the late 1960s.

== Institutes ==
Institutions and research groups based within the school include:

- Institute for Astronomy (IfA) – One of the UK's major centres of astronomical research, specialising in survey astronomy, cosmology, active galaxies and the formation of stars and planets.
- Institute for Condensed Matter and Complex Systems (ICMCS)
- Institute for Particle and Nuclear Physics (IPNP)
- Higgs Centre for Theoretical Physics – A new centre established in 2012 to "seek an even deeper understanding of how the universe works."

The school is housed in the James Clerk Maxwell Building on the University's King's Buildings campus.

== Notable people ==
Catherine Heymans, the incumbent Astronomer Royal for Scotland, is a professor at the School of Physics and Astronomy, and is the course organiser for the pre-honours Introductory Astrophysics course.

Five winners of the Nobel Prize in Physics are associated with the University: Charles Glover Barkla (X-ray), Edward Appleton (Ionospheric Physics, Radar), Max Born (Quantum Mechanics), Igor Tamm (Particle Physics, Cherenkov Radiation, Phonon, Tokamak) and Peter Higgs (Higgs Boson, Higgs Mechanism, Higgs Field). Further notable physicists associated with the University include Thomas Young, Joseph Black, James Clerk Maxwell, David Brewster, Peter Guthrie Tait, Klaus Fuchs, C. G. Darwin, Nicholas Kemmer, David Olive, John Polkinghorne, Tom Kibble, Michael Cates, Fabiola Gianotti, Neil Turok.

== See also ==
- EPCC
- Royal Observatory, Edinburgh
