= Marion Ross (physicist) =

Scottish physicist

Marion Amelia Spence Ross FRSE
- Born: 9 April 1903; Edinburgh, Scotland
- Died: 3 January 1994 (aged 90)
- Education: University of Edinburgh
- Known for: Beevers–Ross and anti-Beevers–Ross sites first female secretary of the Royal Society of Edinburgh street at King's Buildings, University of Edinburgh named for her annual Marion A S Ross Prize, University of Edinburgh
- Scientific career
- Fields: fluid dynamics, x-ray crystallography
- Workplaces: University of Edinburgh; University of Manchester
- Thesis: Scattering and filtering of heterogeneous x-rays by matter of small atomic weight

Marion Amelia Spence Ross FRSE (9 April 1903 – 3 January 1994) was a Scottish physicist noted for her work in x-ray crystallography and fluid dynamics.

== Life ==
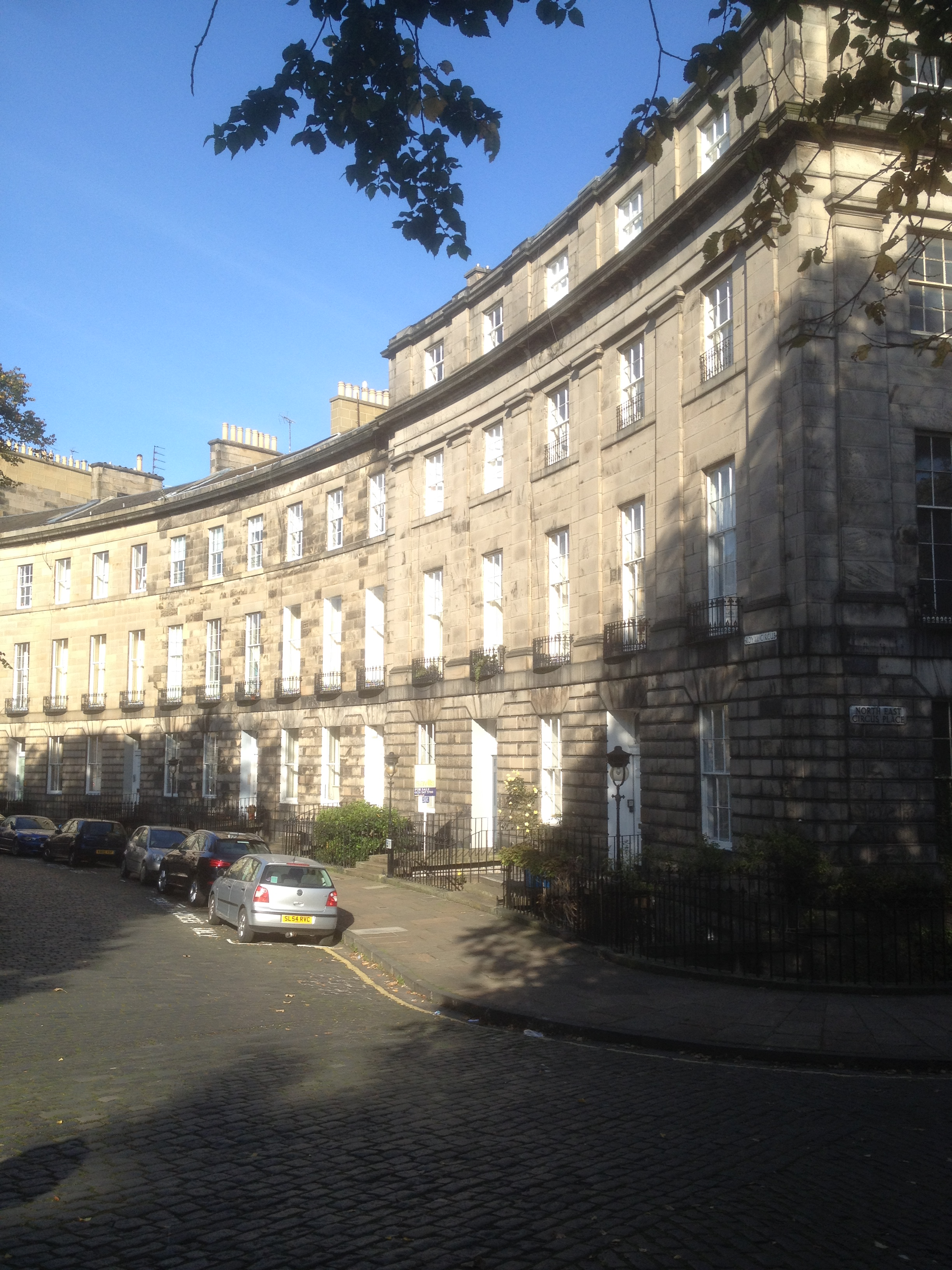
Royal Circus, Edinburgh

Ross was born in Edinburgh, one of the five daughters of William Baird Ross, organist, composer and founder of The Edinburgh Society of Organists (ESO). The family lived at 22 Royal Crescent in Edinburgh's New Town.

After being educated at Edinburgh Ladies' College, Marion Ross studied mathematics and natural philosophy at the University of Edinburgh, receiving prestigious bursaries in mathematics, and graduating with honours. Ross then studied at teacher training college in Cambridge for one year and taught mathematics in a secondary school in Woking, Surrey for two years. In 1928, she took up a post as Assistant Lecturer in the Department of Physics at the University of Edinburgh, and instigated a course in acoustics for music students.

In the Second World War she was a rare example of a female scientist working for the Admiralty. Based at Rosyth docks she led a team involved in underwater acoustics and hydrodynamics.

Her work with Professor C. G. Barkla resulted in her being awarded a PhD in 1943.

For one year, she worked under the direction of William Lawrence Bragg at the University of Manchester, and together with Arnold Beevers, explored the structure of the crystal Beta Alumina. They noted there were 'problem' sites in the areas occupied by mobile sodium ions. Subsequently, the presence of these ions was discovered to make this crystal an efficient superconductor. As a tribute to their discovery, the locations of these ions are now known as Beevers–Ross and anti-Beevers–Ross sites.

After the war she returned to the University of Edinburgh as a lecturer, studying high-energy particle spectra. She was the first director of the university's fluid dynamics unit. Some of her work was published in the journal Nature.

In 1951 she became a Fellow of the Royal Society of Edinburgh, two years after the first female Fellows were admitted. Her proposers were Norman Feather, Max Born, Alexander Aitken and Sir Edmund Taylor Whittaker. She was the first female secretary to the society (1993/4).

Her interest in fluid flows led to Ross setting up a fluid dynamics unit within the Department of Physics. Many students were attracted to this field of study, supervised by Ross.

Ross was elected to University Court for session 1967-68, one of the first non-professorial members of staff to serve. Her contributions to the university were rewarded with a readership, and her success was particularly notable given the male-dominated nature of the profession. On her retirement, the annually awarded Marion A S Ross Prize was founded in her name. In 2014 a street at the University's Kings Buildings campus was named in her honour.

== Personal life ==
Outside her professional life, Ross had a wide range of interests, including literature, art, music, and politics. She was particularly interested in the organ that her father had designed for the Holy Rude Church, Stirling, where he was the organist, and where Ross sang in the choir.

Ross died on 3 January 1994. Her obituary describes her as "an enthusiast and a person of high ideals and purpose. The type of person who looked for work that needed doing and got on and did it voluntarily. Her research in nuclear and X-ray physics, and in fluid dynamics, is internationally recognised and has inspired others to follow in her footsteps. She will be remembered with affection and gratitude by her students, her colleagues and by her family."

== Recognition ==
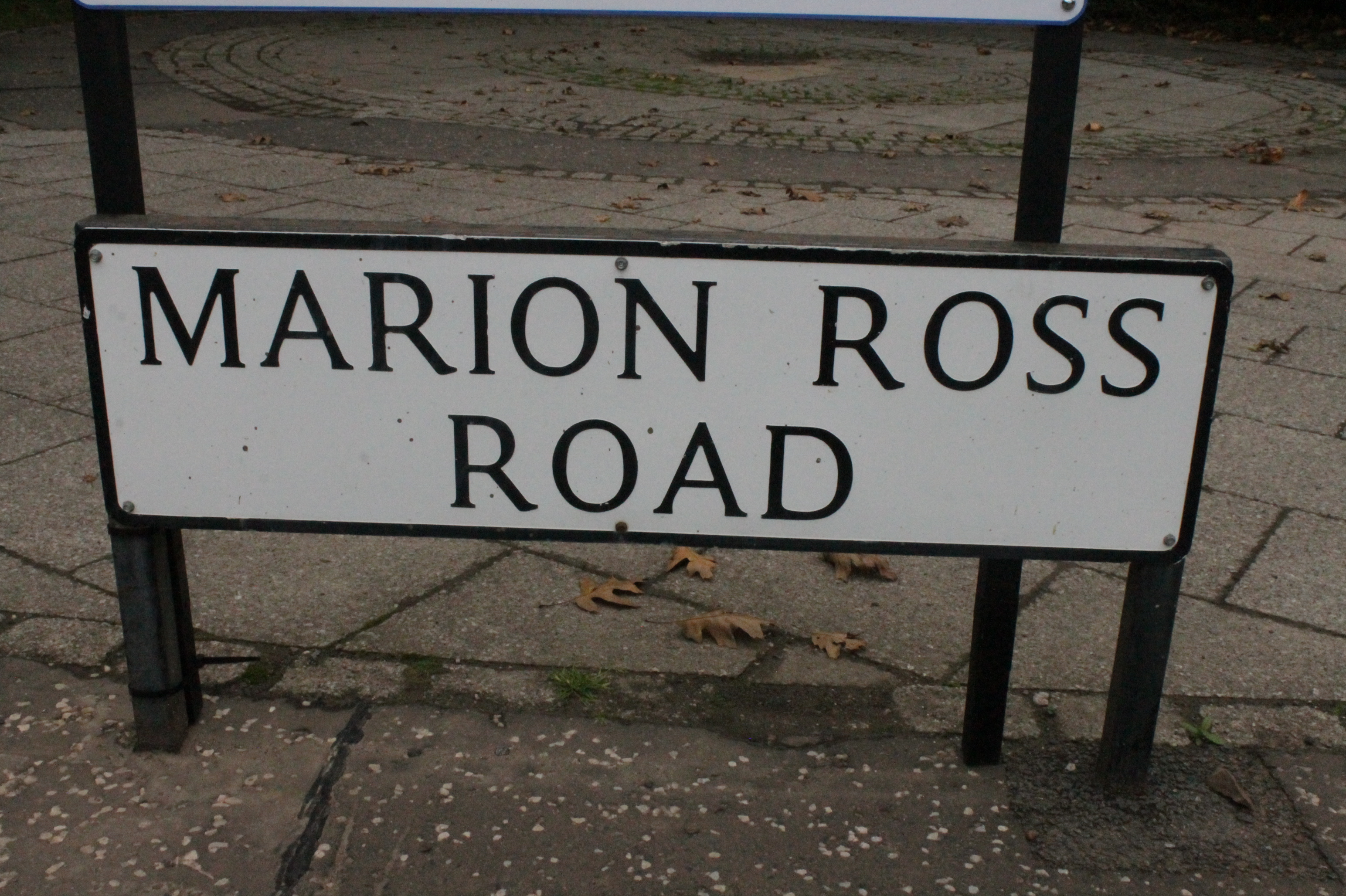
Marion Ross Road, King's Buildings, Edinburgh

Marion Ross Road within Edinburgh University's King's Buildings complex is named in her honour.
