= Heng Xiaofan =

Chinese politician

Heng Xiaofan (born December 1967, Chinese: 衡晓帆), a native of Houma, Shanxi, is a Chinese politician.

== Biography ==
He joined the Chinese Communist Party in January 1987. In 1989, he graduated from the Chinese Department of Beijing Normal University, majoring in Chinese Literature. In May 2011, he became the chief of the Fengtai Branch of the Beijing Municipal Public Security Bureau. In December 2015, he became the deputy secretary of the Party Committee and director of the Political Department of the Beijing Municipal Public Security Bureau. In June 2018, he became the deputy chief of the Beijing Municipal Public Security Bureau.

In March 2019, he was appointed as the Inner Mongolia Autonomous Region's Public Security Department and secretary of the Municipal Committee of Political and Legal Affairs. In March 2020, he became director of the Public Security Department of the People's Government of the Inner Mongolia Autonomous Region, inspector general of the Public Security Department of the People's Government of the Inner Mongolia Autonomous Region, as well as deputy secretary of the Party Committee of the Autonomous Region's Politics and Law Committee. In April 2020, he won the position of vice-chairman of the People's Government of the Inner Mongolia Autonomous Region.

In 2022, he was appointed as vice-mayor of the Tianjin Municipal Public Security Bureau. In April 2024, he became a member of the Standing Committee of the Tianjin Municipal Committee of the Chinese Communist Party and secretary of the Municipal Party Committee for Political and Legal Affairs.

Government offices
| Preceded by Yang Weidong | Director of the Public Security Department of the Inner Mongolia Autonomous Region; March 2019-July 2022 | Succeeded by Zheng Guangzhao |
