= Leslie Colin Woods =

New Zealand mathematician

- Born: Leslie Colin Woodhead; 6 December 1922; Reporoa, New Zealand
- Died: 15 April 2007 (aged 84); Oxford, United Kingdom
- Education: University of Oxford
- Scientific career
- Fields: Mathematics
- Doctoral advisor: Alexander Thom
- Doctoral students: Jason Reese

Leslie Colin Woods (6 December 1922 – 15 April 2007) was a New Zealand mathematician.

== Early life and education ==
Woods was born on 6 December 1922 in Reporoa, New Zealand. Woods' father was a fisherman. His surname was originally Woodhead.

His school education was completed in New Zealand, where he attended Seddon Memorial Technical College (where he was Head Boy). In his autobiography Against the Tide: An Autobiographical Account of a Professional Outsider, he gives credit to his school teachers, including Colin Maloy and G J Park, for kindling his interest in science and encouraging him to take up a career in academia.

In 1940 Woods went on to study at Auckland University College, but left to join the Royal New Zealand Air Force in December 1941. After completing his training as a pilot he was posted to the Pacific Area in 1943, serving three tours of duty in 1944 and 1945.

After the war Woods returned to Auckland University College, taking his MSc in 1945 and a BE in 1947. The following year he matriculated at Merton College, Oxford on a Rhodes Scholarship; he studied there until 1951, taking a DPhil in 1950, and then, unusually, a first-class BA in Mathematics in 1951.

== Academic career ==
Woods was the Nuffield Research Professor of Mechanical Engineering at the University of Technology at Sydney. He was elected a Fellow of Balliol College, Oxford in 1961 where he researched the theory of magnetically-confined hot plasmas. Woods was professor of mathematics at the University of Oxford from 1970 until his retirement in 1990.

== Personal life ==
In 1943, Woods married Gladys Elizabeth (Betty) Bayley; they had five daughters.

Woods died on 15 April 2007 in Oxford.

== Bibliography ==
His notable books include:

- The Theory of Subsonic Plane Flow (1961)
- The Thermodynamics of Fluid Systems (1975)
- Principles of Magnetoplasma Dynamics (1987)
- Kinetic Theory of Gases and Magnetoplasmas (1993)
- Thermodynamic Inequalities with Applications to Gases and Magnetoplasmas (1996)
- Against the Tide: An Autobiographical Account of a Professional Outsider (2000)
- Physics of Plasmas (2003)
- Theory of Tokamak Transport: New Aspects for Nuclear Fusion Reactor Design (2006)
