= Jason Reese =

British engineering scientist (1967–2019)

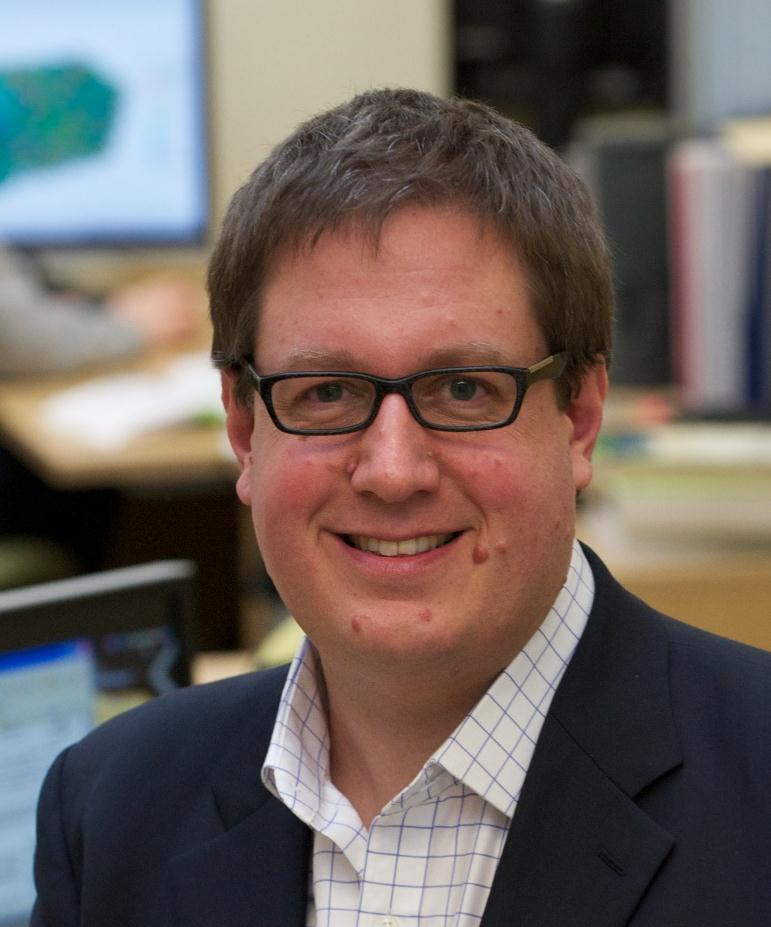
- Born: Jason Meredith Reese; 24 June 1967; Wimbledon, London, England
- Died: 8 March 2019 (aged 51)
- Education: University of Oxford (DPhil); Imperial College London (BSc)
- Known for: Multiscale modelling Microfluidics & Nanofluidics; Rarefied gas dynamics
- Awards: Philip Leverhulme Prize; MacRobert Award
- Scientific career
- Fields: Mechanical engineering Aerospace engineering
- Workplaces: University of Edinburgh; University of Strathclyde; King's College London; University of Aberdeen; Technische Universität Berlin; University of Cambridge
- Thesis: On the structure of shock waves in monatomic rarefied gases (1993)
- Website: research.ed.ac.uk/portal/jreese

Jason Meredith Reese FREng FRSE FInstP FIMechE (24 June 1967 – 8 March 2019) was a British engineering scientist, and Regius Professor of Engineering at the University of Edinburgh.

His research was in multiscale flow systems in which the molecular or discrete nature of the fluid determines the overall fluid dynamics. A winner of the Philip Leverhulme Prize for Engineering (Leverhulme Trust), the Lord Kelvin Medal (Royal Society of Edinburgh), and a MacRobert Award (Royal Academy of Engineering) finalist, he was previously Weir Professor of Thermodynamics & Fluid Mechanics, and Head of the Mechanical & Aerospace Engineering Department, at the University of Strathclyde, Glasgow.

== Education ==
Jason Reese studied at Imperial College London, graduating in Physics in 1988. He completed his Masters and Doctoral research in Applied Mathematics at the University of Oxford in 1993, where he was one of the last research students of Leslie Colin Woods.

== Career and research ==
After his PhD, Reese moved into engineering and was a postdoctoral researcher at Technische Universität Berlin, and the University of Cambridge. In 1996 he became a lecturer in Engineering in the University of Aberdeen, and then joined King's College London in 2001 as Lecturer and ExxonMobil Engineering Fellow. He moved to the University of Strathclyde in 2003 as the Weir Professor of Thermodynamics & Fluid Mechanics, and was latterly Head of the Department of Mechanical & Aerospace Engineering. In 2013 he was appointed to the Regius Professorship at the University of Edinburgh, the ninth incumbent of this position since it was established by Queen Victoria in 1868.

Reese was an engineering scientist who conducted and published theoretical and computational research into multiscale fluid dynamics, in particular, micro and nano flows, as well as rarefied gas dynamics. He was also involved in the industrial application of fluid mechanics: he was part of the team that founded Brinker Technology Ltd in 2002 to commercialise a novel leak detection and sealing system for oil/gas pipelines and wellheads, and water mains pipes.

From 2012 to 2016, Reese was a member of the Scottish Science Advisory Council, Scotland's highest level science advisory body, providing independent advice and recommendations on science strategy, policy and priorities to the Scottish Government.

In 2018, he was awarded a 10-year Chair in Emerging Technologies by the Royal Academy of Engineering, to research and develop multiscale engineering design, "from molecules to machines".

Reese was an independent member of the Defence Science Expert Committee, DSEC, providing independent scientific and technological advice to the UK's Ministry of Defence. He was also an independent member of the Science & Technology Honours Committee, reviewing and advising on recommendations for UK national honours.

He died suddenly at the age of 51 on 8 March 2019; his full obituary was published in The Herald (Glasgow) on 24 March 2019.

== Awards and honours ==
Recognition of his engineering achievements includes:

- 2000 ExxonMobil Engineering Fellowship, Royal Academy of Engineering
- 2003 Philip Leverhulme Prize for Engineering, Leverhulme Trust
- 2004 36th Bruce-Preller Prize Lectureship, Royal Society of Edinburgh
- 2005 Fellow of the Institute of Physics (FInstP)
- 2006 Fellow of the Institution of Mechanical Engineers (FIMechE)
- 2006 Fellow of the Royal Society of Edinburgh (FRSE)
- 2006 Finalist, MacRobert Award for Innovation in Engineering, Royal Academy of Engineering
- 2011 Fellow of the Royal Academy of Engineering (FREng)
- 2015 Lord Kelvin Medal (Senior Prize in Physical Sciences), Royal Society of Edinburgh
- 2016 Fellow of the American Physical Society (APS Fellow)
- 2018 Chair in Emerging Technologies, Royal Academy of Engineering
