= Peter Mitchell Grant =

Scottish professor of engineering (born 1944)

Professor Peter Mitchell Grant OBE FRSE FREng FIEE FHEA FIEEE
- Born: 20 June 1944 (age 82); St Andrews, Scotland
- Education: Strathallan School; Heriot Watt University; University of Edinburgh
- Known for: Signal Processing
- Awards: Faraday Medal; FRSE; FREng; OBE
- Scientific career
- Fields: Signal processing
- Workplaces: University of Edinburgh, UK; IET, UK

Peter Mitchell Grant (born 20 June 1944) is Senior Honorary Professorial Fellow, former Regius Professor of Engineering and Head of School of Engineering and Electronics at the University of Edinburgh. In 2004 he was awarded the 82nd Faraday Medal by the Institute of Electrical Engineers for his 'outstanding contributions to signal processing'.

== Education ==
Peter Mitchell Grant was born in St Andrews and educated at Strathallan School, Perthshire in Scotland. He studied electrical and electronic engineering (BSc Hons) at Heriot Watt University and then for a PhD at the University of Edinburgh.

== Career ==
Following graduation from Heriot-Watt University in 1966 Grant worked for Plessey in Havant as a development engineer on the design of digital frequency synthesisers and standards for the Clansman mobile radio communications system. In 1970 Grant moved to Glenrothes to work for Hughes Microelectronics where he had responsibility for the development of an electronic coin recognition system. Between 1971 and 1976 he was a research fellow at the University of Edinburgh where he studied the design and applications of surface acoustic wave (SAW) programmable analogue matched filters in communication systems, attaining his PhD in 1975. From 1976 to 1982 Mitchell was a lecturer at the University of Edinburgh, where he continued his earlier research with emphasis on the design of a range of wideband analogue Fourier transform processors for signal intercept, analysis and processing.

In 1977 he was invited to take the position of visiting assistant professor at the Gintzon Laboratory, Stanford University, where he supervised the design of a digital phased array acoustic imaging system. From 1982 to 1987 he was a reader at the University of Edinburgh, where his research focused on lattice, frequency domain and block adaptive transversal and nonlinear filter structures for the design of faster converging adaptive equalisers for radio communication applications. In 1985 he was invited by the Massachusetts Institute of Technology, Lincoln Laboratory to conduct research into radar and optical image processing. In 1987 he was appointed Professor of Electronic Signal Processing at the University of Edinburgh, where he led the department's signal processing research group activities and actively investigated future research activities for the group in mobile communications, through collaboration with industrial companies. From 2002 until 2008 Professor Grant was Head of School of Engineering and Electronics at the University of Edinburgh. In 2008 he was a visiting professor at Rice University and in 2009 a visiting fellow at Princeton University.

Throughout his career Grant has been a member or chairman of numerous committees, most notably, the Scottish Science Advisory Council; advising the Scottish Government on topics regarding science, engineering and technology. Grant was president of the European Association for Signal, Speech and Image Processing (EURASIP) from 2000 to 2002. He was a long serving Trustee and now Honorary Fellow of the James Clerk Maxwell Foundation. He has been a director of several companies and awarded four full international patents.

== Publications ==
Grant has over four hundred publications to his name, including four books:

- Colin N. F. Cowan; Peter M. Grant; Peter F. Adams (1985). Adaptive filters. Prentice-Hall. ISBN 9780130040374.
- Peter M. Grant; Colin F.N. Cowan; B. Mulgrew (1989). Analogue and Digital Signal Processing. Chartwell-Bratt. ISBN 0862382068.
- Ian A. Glover; Peter M. Grant (1997). Digital Communications. Prentice Hall. ISBN 0135653916.
- Bernard Mulgrew; Peter M. Grant; John S. Thompson (1998). Digital Signal Processing: Concepts and Applications. Palgrave. ISBN 0333963563.

== Honours and awards ==
Fellow of Institute of Electrical and Electronics Engineers, New York (FIEEE).

Fellow of Royal Academy of Engineering (FREng).

Fellow of Royal Society of Edinburgh (FRSE).

Fellow of Institution of Engineering and Technology, formerly Electrical Engineers, London (FIET/FIEE).

Fellow of the Higher Education Academy, formerly Institute for Learning and Teaching (ILTM/FHEA).

In 2007 he was one of the first four signal processing researchers to be elevated to 'EURASIP Fellow', the European Association of Signal Processing's most prestigious honour.

In 2009 Queens Birthday Honours he was appointed an Officer of the Order of the British Empire (OBE).

In 2006 he was awarded an honorary DEng degree from Heriot-Watt University

In 2007 he was awarded an honorary DEng degree from Napier University.
