= Themis Prodromakis =

British electronics engineer (born 1981)

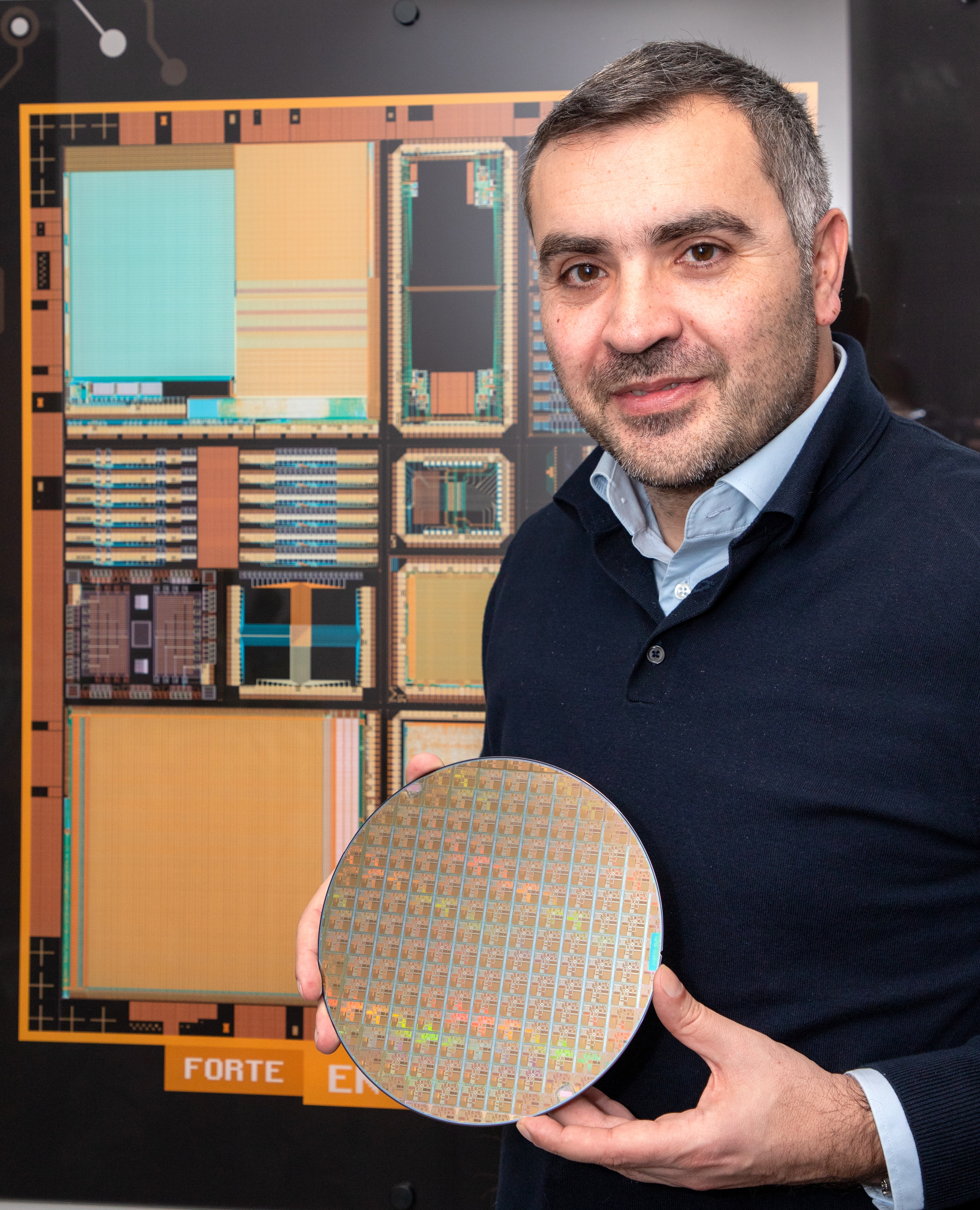
Prof Themis Prodromakis

Themistoklis "Themis" Prodromakis, FRSC, FBCS, FInstP, FIET, CEng (Greek: Θεμιστοκλής Προδρομάκης, born 1 September 1981) is an electronic engineer. In 2022 he joined the School of Engineering at the University of Edinburgh as the Regius Professor of Engineering. Prodromakis is also Founder of the Centre for Electronics Frontiers. and holds a Royal Academy of Engineering Chair in Emerging Technologies in AI hardware technologies.

He is the founder and director of ArC Instruments a company that commercialises high-performance testing instruments for semiconductor technologies.

He has been involved in developing emerging metal-oxide resistive random-access memory technologies with applications in embedded electronics. and biomedicine. His research on tool development and the optimisation of solid-state device technologies allowed him to demonstrate world-record performance in analogue memory, where single devices can store over 100 discernible memory states. He showcased the use of memristor technologies in a variety of applications: on-node bio-signal processors that compared to state-of-art CMOS achieve a 200 times better compression efficiency and over 2-orders of magnitude power savings per channel; in-silico implementations of unsupervised learning, empowering the handling of big-unlabelled-data efficiently and robustly; and a novel microelectronics design paradigm that fuses the analogue and digital worlds and enables energy efficient implementations of analogue reconfigurable gates. He was also the first to demonstrate a bio-hybrid network comprising real and artificial neurons that was linked via memristor synapse emulators over the internet.

Prodromakis has published over 400 research papers and holds more than 10 patents in the field of semiconductors and AI hardware technologies. His contributions in memristive technologies and applications have brought this emerging technology one step closer to the electronics industry for which he was recognised as a 2021 Blavatnik Award UK Honoree in Physical Sciences and Engineering.

He established and directed the Lloyd's Register Foundation International Consortium for Nanotechnologies, a global initiative that supported 52 talented individuals for building a safer world with nanotechnologies. He also played a key role in growing the remit of memristors by inaugurating and chairing MEMRISYS. In 2020 he was appointed Editor in Chief of Frontiers on Nanotechnology. He is a keen advocate for explaining his research to the public through outreach activities, lectures and general interest articles.

Since 2024, he has been Director of APRIL (AI for Productive Research and Innovation in Electronics), an EPSRC-funded AI hub that is developing tools for faster, cheaper, greener and overall more power-efficient electronics.

In 2025, he was awarded the Princess Royal Silver Medal from the Royal Academy of Engineering for his outstanding personal contribution to UK engineering through his work on emerging semiconductor technologies for sustainable AI hardware.

In 2026, Prodromakis was appointed Head of Research of the Institute for Integrated Micro and Nano Systems at the University of Edinburgh.
