= Lindsay Beevers =

Environmental engineer specialising in climate change resilience

Lindsay Beevers, FRSE is a professor of environmental engineering at the University of Edinburgh (2022- ) and is the head of the institute for infrastructure and the environment. She has worked on rivers all over the world through her research on numerical analysis of extremes of hydrological changes and models to predict future change due to climate change and the impacts on infrastructure. In 2024, Beevers was made a Fellow of the Royal Society of Edinburgh.

== Education ==
Beevers graduated in 1999 with a masters in civil engineering with geology at the University of Glasgow, proceeding in 2004 to a Ph.D on Morphological sustainability of estuarine barrages. Later she took a PGCert in academic practice at Heriot-Watt University.

== Research and career ==
Beevers has worked at Heriot-Watt University (2010-2022), IHE-Delft Netherlands (2007 -2010) and prior to that as a civil engineer for Jacobs (2003-2007). She has conducted research on river systems all over the world, but had particular focus on the Nile and Zambezi Basins in Africa and the Mekong in Asia. Her work also involved other water systems in Sub-Saharan Africa, India and South America. She has authored over 50 peer reviewed articles and 6 book chapters.

In 2016, she was awarded the EPSRC LWEC Challenge Fellowship to focus on Water Resilient Cities examining the impact of climate change on water systems and adaptability within UK cities.
