= James L. King (engineer) =

James Lawrence King FIMA (1922-c.1995) was a distinguished British engineer, and a former Regius Professor of Engineering in the University of Edinburgh.

== Life ==
King was born on 14 February 1922, and attended Latymer Upper School before going up to Jesus College, Cambridge University, graduating in about 1942 with a first class honours degree in mathematics. He then joined the Scientific Civil Service as part of the Ministry of Defence (Navy). After obtaining a PhD from Imperial College, he became Chief Scientist at the Naval Construction Research Establishment, Rosyth. Set up during World War II to carry out research on underwater explosions and the best structural design features to resist explosive damage, by the 1950s the Naval Construction Research Establishment was investigating structural strength issues for submarines, aircraft carriers, and floatings docks. In particular, design problems in construction, welding, brittle fracture, and the development of stronger steels. Substantial experimental facilities existed on site in Rosyth, including universal testing machines of up to 500 tons capacity, and high pressure chambers for hydrostatic tests.

In 1968, King was appointed as the sixth Regius Professor of Engineering in the University of Edinburgh, and became Head of its Department of Mechanical Engineering. His main research interests lay in materials science. He expanded the department’s activities in vibration, and heat and mass transfer, as well as materials science (this latter work being supported by his former government employers). He also encouraged the new work in the department on wave power.

In the year preceding King’s arrival at the university, a School of Engineering Science had been formed. With the professors from the Departments of Chemical, Civil, and Electrical Engineering he restructured the undergraduate degree course into a new four year honours curriculum that contained a substantial element of common subjects in the first two years.

He married Pamela Hitchcock in 1951; they had a son and a daughter. Professor King retired in 1983, and died about 1995.
