= George Frederick Armstrong =

English academic

- Born: 15 May 1842; Doncaster, England
- Died: 16 November 1900 (aged 58); Grasmere, Westmorland, England
- Education: Cambridge University; King's College London
- Known for: Engineering; Academic
- Spouse: Margaret Brown

George Frederick Armstrong, MA FRSE MICE FGS FRSSA (15 May 1842 – 16 November 1900), was a distinguished 19th century English academic specialising in railway, civil, and sanitary engineering who served as the Regius Professor of Engineering at the University of Edinburgh. Over the course of his life he became a member of many learned societies and the author of many papers and lectures.

== Early life and education ==
Armstrong was born in Doncaster, Yorkshire, England on 15 May 1842. As the eldest son of George Armstrong, a woollen-draper, his early education in engineering began with work in the locomotive depots and repair shops of the Great Northern Railway in his home of Doncaster. At the age seventeen, he began his formal education when he enrolled in King's College, London, then one of the few colleges with an engineering program. Armstrong remained at King's College from 1857 until he completed his studies in 1860. He then enrolled at Cambridge University, first in St. John's College and then in Jesus College, where he graduated with a bachelor's degree in 1864. While there, Armstrong participated in high jump competitions, winning at least one award. Armstrong continued with his studies until 1867 when he graduated with a master's degree.

== Career ==
=== Early career ===
Armstrong began his career as an assistant engineer under Richard Johnson, the then chief engineer of the Great Northern Railway. By 1869 he returned to work at the company's locomotive works at home to Doncaster. He then became engineer of the Isle of Man Railway Company.

In 1871, Armstrong moved into academia when he became the first 'Professor of Civil Engineering' at the Applied Science School of McGill University, in Montreal, Quebec, Canada. Once in this role, he organised a completely new university department and designed the engineering curriculum for its students. At the university for five years, he was a captain of the university companies of the First Regiment of the Canadian Militia. In 1876 he returned to Britain as the new Chair of Engineering at the Yorkshire College. Throughout 1879 he undertook elaborate observations and experiments to determine the diurnal variations in the amount of carbon dioxide in the atmosphere, and the results were then published through the Royal Society.

=== Regius Professor ===
In 1885, Armstrong (who was of Scottish descent) was appointed by the Crown to become the second Regius Professor of Engineering at the University of Edinburgh, a post which he held until his death. His inaugural lecture as the Regius Professor was entitled "The Progress of Technical Education at Home and Abroad." By all accounts the lecture was a success, being quoted in a debate by the leader of the House of Commons, Sir Stafford Northcote, and leading to an endowment by the wealthy brewer of the eponymous Fulton Laboratory at the university in 1889.

The Fulton Engineering Laboratory was established under his tenure "to provide systematic instruction on experimental methods [...] and to familiarise [sic] students with the strength and other physical properties of the chief materials used by engineers." Perhaps under the influence of writer Charles Kingsley, Armstrong inaugurated courses on sanitary engineering for the benefit of the medical students studying public health. The courses in sanitation led to the foundation of a separate university department with a new professor of public health at its head. Armstrong also carried out the plans of his predecessor, Fleeming Jenkin, to create courses on electrical engineering, which later developed as a sub-discipline of engineering. Attested as a methodical but genial teacher, Armstrong was popular among engineering students at Edinburgh University and supported the university's athletic endeavours. He sang at the students' union reception for Oliver Wendell Holmes, and supported the university's Reid Concerts.

=== Public service ===
Armstrong gave special attention to questions regarding water supply sanitation and became engineering adviser to the Local Government Board for Scotland under the Public Health Act. George Armstrong served as a convener of the Engineering and Machinery Committee of the Edinburgh International Exhibition of 1885, and as Vice Chairman of the Executive Committee of the Edinburgh International Exhibition of 1890, which had grown out of a planned celebration for Scotland's newly completed Forth Bridge. He was honorary local secretary for the Institution of Mechanical Engineers, the Iron and Steel Institute, and the British Association, as well as Honorary President of the East of Scotland Engineering Association. He was a member of the Institution of Civil Engineers, a Fellow of the Royal Society of Edinburgh, and a Fellow of the Geological Society of London. Armstrong was president of the Sanitary Engineering Section of the British Institute of Public Health in Edinburgh in 1893. He was elected President of the Royal Scottish Society of Arts in 1896, and became a Fellow at his alma mater, King's College, in 1899. In his final years, he was an external examiner in engineering to the University of Wales and a member of the Board of Trustees of Wordsworth College. He served as both Justice of the Peace for his home county of Westmorland and Chairman of the Grasmere District Council.

== Later years and death ==
Armstrong married Margaret Brown in 1893, with whom he had his son George Cyril Frederick, two other sons, and a daughter. After suffering from heart problems for several months, which necessitated a leave of absence, George Armstrong died at his home in the village of Grasmere on 16 November 1900. He was succeeded as Regius Professor by Thomas Hudson Beare and was buried in his village at St. Oswald's Church.

== Works ==
- A Lecture on the Progress of Higher Technical Instruction: At Home and Abroad in Relation to the Education of Engineers, Being a Public Inaugural Address Delivered in the University of Edinburgh
- Inaugural lecture of the Department of Practical Science in McGill University, Montreal, delivered in the William Molson Hall, Monday, 19 February 1872
- On the Diurnal Variation in the Amount of Carbon Dioxide in the Air

Preceded by Henry Charles Fleeming Jenkin	Regius Professor of Engineering (Edinburgh); 1885–1900	Succeeded by Thomas Hudson Beare
