= College of Science and Engineering, University of Edinburgh =

One of the three colleges of the University of Edinburgh

College of Science and Engineering
- Established: 1583
- Vice-Principal and Head of College: Prof Iain Grant Gordon
- Academic staff: 1362
- Administrative staff: 744
- Students: 9258
- Undergraduates: 6235
- Postgraduates: 3023
- Address: King's Buildings, West Mains Road, Edinburgh, EH9 3JY, United Kingdom, Edinburgh, Scotland; 55.922778°N 3.175°W
- Campus: King's Buildings Central Edinburgh
- Website: ed.ac.uk/science-engineering

The College of Science and Engineering is one of the three colleges of the University of Edinburgh. With over 2,000 staff and around 9,000 students, it is one of the largest science and engineering groupings in the UK. The college is largely located at the King's Buildings campus and consists of the separate schools of:

- School of Biological Sciences
- School of Chemistry
- School of Engineering
- School of GeoSciences
- School of Informatics
- School of Mathematics
- School of Physics and Astronomy

== History ==
Science has been studied at Edinburgh since the university was established as the 'Tounis College' in 1583. In the sixteenth century science was taught as 'natural philosophy'. The seventeenth century saw the institution of the University Chairs of Mathematics and Botany, followed the next century by Chairs of Natural History, Astronomy, Chemistry and Agriculture. During the eighteenth century, the university was a key contributor to the Scottish Enlightenment and it educated many of the leading scientists of the time. It was Edinburgh's professors who took a leading part in the formation of the Royal Society of Edinburgh in 1783. In 1785, Joseph Black, Professor of Chemistry and discoverer of carbon dioxide, founded the world's first Chemical Society. The nineteenth century was a time of huge advances in scientific thinking and technological development. The first named degrees of Bachelor and Doctor of Science were instituted in 1864, and a separate 'Faculty of Science' was created in 1893 after three centuries of scientific advances at Edinburgh. The Regius Chair in Engineering in 1868, and the Regius Chair in Geology in 1871, were also founded.

In 1991 the Faculty of Science was renamed the Faculty of Science and Engineering, and in 2002 it became the College of Science and Engineering.

== Schools ==
=== School of Biological Sciences ===
- Institute of Cell Biology (ICB)
- Institute of Ecology and Evolution (IEE)
- Institute of Molecular Plant Sciences (IMPS)
- Institute of Immunology & Infection (IIIR)
- Institute for Stem Cell Research (Centre for Regenerative Medicine) (ISCR)
- Institute of Quantitative Biology, Biochemistry and Biotechnology (IQB3)

=== School of Engineering ===
- Institute for Bioengineering (IBioE)
- Institute for Imaging, Data and Communications (IDCoM)
- Institute for Energy Systems (IES)
- Institute for Infrastructure and Environment (IIE)
- Institute for Integrated Micro and Nano Systems (IMNS)
- Institute for Materials and Processes (IMP)
- Institute for Multiscale Thermofluids (IMT)

=== School of Informatics ===
- Laboratory for Foundations of Computer Science (LFCS)
- Institute for Adaptive and Neural Computation (ANC)
- Centre for Intelligent Systems and their Applications (CISA)
- Institute for Language, Cognition, and Computation (ILCC)
- Institute for Computing Systems Architecture (ICSA)
- Institute of Perception, Action and Behaviour (IPAB)

=== School of Physics and Astronomy ===
- Higgs Centre for Theoretical Physics
- Institute for Astronomy (IfA)
- Institute for Condensed Matter and Complex Systems (ICMCS)
- Institute for Particle and Nuclear Physics (IPNP)
- Edinburgh Parallel Computing Centre
