= Regius Professor of Engineering (Edinburgh) =

Regius Chair of Engineering University of Edinburgh
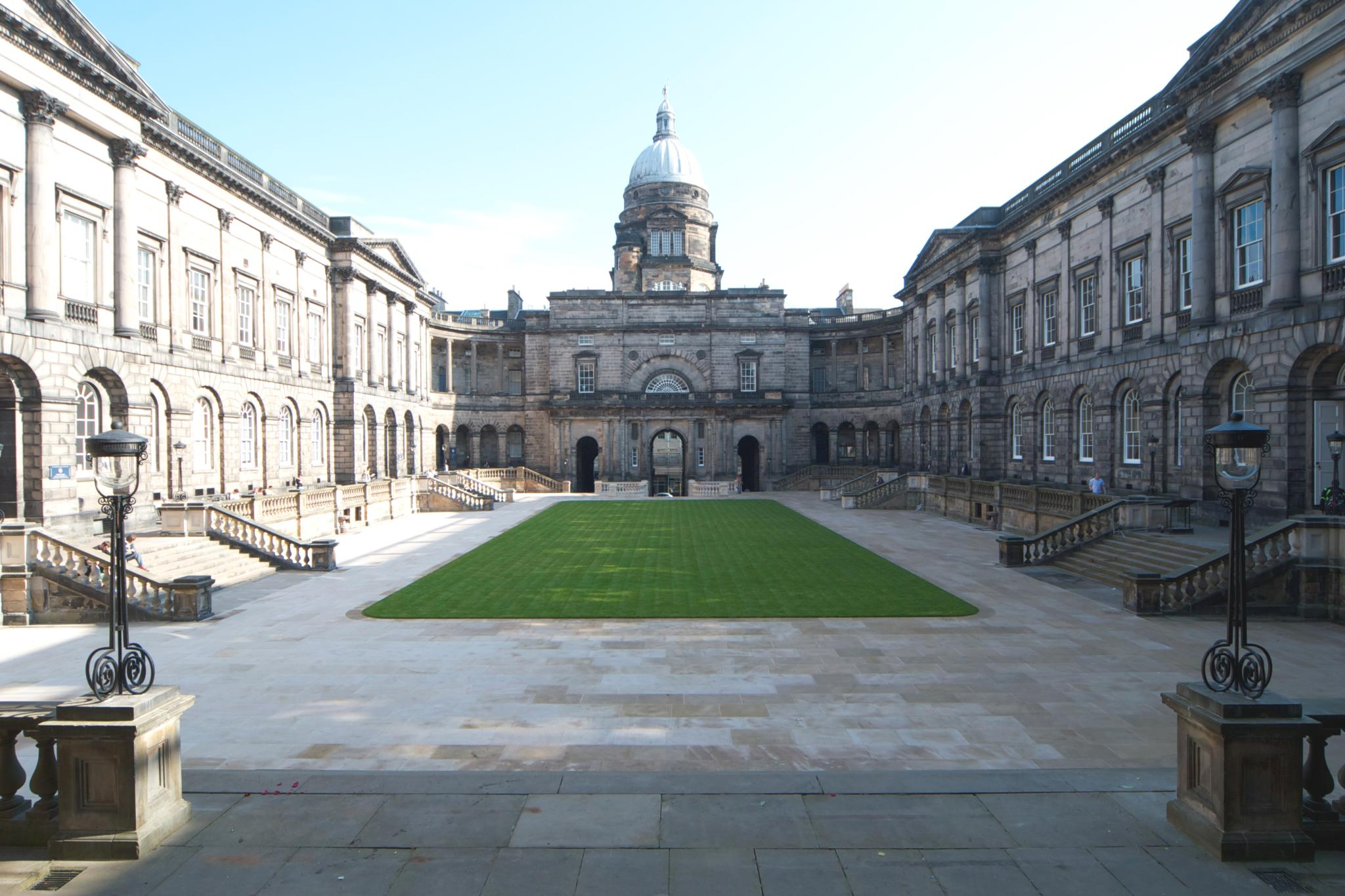
- Incumbent; Themis Prodromakis since 2022
- Formation: 1868
- First holder: Fleeming Jenkin
- Website: www.eng.ed.ac.uk

The Regius Chair of Engineering is a royal professorship in engineering, established since 1868 in the University of Edinburgh, Scotland. The chair is attached to the University's College of Science and Engineering, based in the King's Buildings in Edinburgh. Appointment to the Regius Chair is by Royal Warrant from the British monarch, on the recommendation of Scotland's First Minister.

== History of the chair ==
Regius professorships are a unique feature of academia in the British Isles. The first Regius professorship was in the field of medicine, and founded in 1497 by King James IV of Scotland at University of Aberdeen. Regius Chairs have since been instituted in a variety of academic disciplines in various universities. Each was established by a British monarch, and — except in Ireland — the current monarch still officially appoints the professor (following proper advertisement and interview, through the offices of the university and the national government). This royal imprimatur, and the relative rarity of these professorships, means a Regius Chair is prestigious and highly sought after. Regius Professors are traditionally addressed as 'Regius' and not 'Professor'.

George Wilson was appointed to a new Regius Chair of Technology in the University of Edinburgh in 1855. His interest in acquiring artefacts and relics of the Industrial Revolution led to his simultaneous appointment as the first Director of the Industrial Museum of Scotland (now part of the National Museum of Scotland).

While this Chair of Technology was abolished on Wilson's death in 1859, the growing importance of engineering studies at the University of Edinburgh was recognised by the founding of the Regius Chair of Engineering by Queen Victoria in1868 within the university's Faculty of Arts. The new chair was endowed by Sir David Baxter, of Dundee, and supplemented by annual funds from the UK parliament. Henry Charles Fleeming Jenkin was appointed from the Chair of Engineering at University College, London, to be its first incumbent.

Fleeming (pronounced as "Fleming", so we are informed by his one-time student Robert Louis Stevenson, who wrote an affectionate memoir of him) Jenkin brought to the Regius Chair a notable combination of scientific knowledge, practical experience and business acumen. His reputation rested principally on his work on long-distance undersea telegraphy, and as a member of the committee which drew up the proposals for methods of electrical measurement, subsequently ratified as international electrical standards.

In 1885 George Armstrong, a specialist in railway engineering, became the second Regius Professor, following his move from Yorkshire. Under his supervision, the Fulton Engineering Laboratory was established in 1889, "to provide systematic instruction on experimental methods ... and to familiarise students with the strength and other physical properties of the chief materials used by engineers."

Following Armstrong's death in 1900, Thomas Hudson Beare was appointed as the third Regius Professor of Engineering. He oversaw the Engineering Department grow from a handful of students in the basement of the University's Old College to more than a hundred occupying what the Edinburgh University Journal called "one of the best planned and equipped engineering schools in the Empire". These were the new engineering facilities at the university's King's Buildings, which had been opened in 1935.

In 1946 Ronald Arnold, a Glasgow-born specialist in structural analysis and gyrodynamics, was appointed from Swansea University as the fourth Regius Professor of Engineering. Arnold pioneered in 1960 the division of the unitary department of engineering into separate departments of civil, mechanical and electrical engineering.

Following the untimely death of Arnold in 1963, Leslie Jaeger was appointed fifth Regius Professor, from Magdalene College, Cambridge. Jaeger’s appointment was brief, leaving after only four years to take up the Chair of Civil Engineering and Applied Mechanics at McGill University (coincidentally, the chair that a previous Regius Professor, George Armstrong, had held much earlier).

James King, former Chief Scientist in the Naval Construction Research Establishment at Rosyth, became the sixth Regius Professor in 1968, and on his retirement in 1983 the seventh holder of the chair was Joseph McGeough, who was appointed from the University of Aberdeen to expand the Edinburgh research activities in electro-chemical machining.

Following McGeough's retiral in 2005, the university appointed, in 2007, Peter Grant as the eighth Regius Professor of Engineering, from within the enlarged 26-strong body of professors in the newly merged School of Engineering. Grant had previously led the signal processing research at Edinburgh, with achievements in the design of adaptive filters and mobile communication receivers. He was President of EURASIP, the European Association for Signal Processing from 2000–02 and recipient of the 2004 IEE Faraday Medal. In 2008 he was awarded an OBE.

In 2013 Jason Reese was appointed the ninth Regius Professor of Engineering. With a background in physics and applied mathematics, his research focuses on multiscale flow systems in which the molecular nature of the fluid determines the overall fluid dynamics. For example, micro and nano flows. A former Philip Leverhulme Prize for Engineering (Leverhulme Trust) winner, Bruce-Preller Prize Lecturer (Royal Society of Edinburgh) and MacRobert Award (Royal Academy of Engineering) finalist, he had previously been Weir Professor of Thermodynamics and Fluid Mechanics, and Head of the Mechanical & Aerospace Engineering Department, at the University of Strathclyde, Glasgow.

In 2022 Themis Prodromakis was appointed the tenth Regius Professor of Engineering. He is the Director of the Centre for Electronics Frontiers, holds a Royal Academy of Engineering Chair in Emerging Technologies, is a Fellow of the Royal Society of Chemistry, the British Computer Society, the IET and the Institute of Physics. His work focuses on developing metal-oxide Resistive Random-Access Memory technologies and related applications and is leading an interdisciplinary team comprising 30 researchers with expertise ranging from materials process development to electron devices and circuits and systems for embedded applications.

== Regius Professors of Engineering in the University of Edinburgh ==
- George Wilson MD FRSE (1855) - as the Regius Professor of Technology
- Henry Charles Fleeming Jenkin FRS (1868)
- George Frederick Armstrong FRSE FGS FRSSA (1885)
- Sir Thomas Hudson Beare DL FRSE FRSSA (1901)
- Ronald Nathan Arnold FRSE (1946)
- Leslie Gordon Jaeger CM FRSE FCAE FEIC, FCSCE (1964)
- James Lawrence King FIMA (1968)
- Joseph McGeough FREng FRSE (1983)
- Peter Mitchell Grant OBE FREng FRSE FIEEE (2007)
- Jason Meredith Reese FREng FRSE (2013)
- Themis Prodromakis FRSC FBCS FInstP FIET (2022)
