= Kenneth Denbigh =

English Engineer and philosopher

Kenneth George Denbigh
- Born: 30 May 1911; Luton, England
- Died: 23 January 2004 (aged 92); London, England
- Other name: Prof K G Denbigh
- Occupations: British chemist and scientific philosopher

Kenneth George Denbigh FRS (30 May 1911 – 23 January 2004) was an English physical chemist, chemical engineer and philosopher who specialized in philosophy of science. He wrote much on the issue of time in relation to thermodynamics. He was an associate of the Russian chemist Georgi Gladyshev.

The University of Edinburgh named the Kenneth Denbigh Building at King's Buildings in his honour. They also offer a Kenneth Denbigh Scholarship to science students.

The School of Engineering of The University of Edinburgh awards the Kenneth Denbigh Medal in support of his scientific legacy. The Medal has been first established in 2023 and awarded during the 10th Heat Powered Cycles Conference.

== Life ==
He was born in Luton on 30 May 1911 the son of George Denbigh, manager of Brothertons Chemical Works in Wakefield. He attended the University of Leeds graduating with a BSc in 1932. He then undertook his doctorate under Robert Whytlaw-Gray gaining a PhD in 1934. He worked for Imperial Chemical Industries (ICI) until 1938 when obtained a post of Lecturer in Chemistry at the University of Southampton.

In the Second World War he was taken back into industry, as head of the laboratories for the Royal Ordnance Factory at Bridgwater. This led him into his first hands-on experience with practical issues concerning thermodynamics.

In 1948 he received a post lecturing at the Chemical Engineering Department at the University of Cambridge and this provided a stepping-stone to be Professor of Chemical Technology at the University of Edinburgh in 1955. This in turn took him to Imperial College, London in 1960. In 1966 his final move was to be principal of Queen Elizabeth College in London.

He was elected a Fellow of the Royal Society of London in 1965.

He died in London on 23 January 2004.

== Family ==
He married Kathleen Enoch in 1935. They had two sons.

His son Jonathan Denbigh was also a scientist.

== Publications ==
- The Thermodynamics of the Steady State (1951)
- Thermodynamics and the Sense of Time (1953)
- The Principles of Chemical Equilibrium (1955)
- Science, Industry and Social Policy (1963)
- Chemical Reactor Theory (1965)
- An Inventive Universe (1975)
- Three Concepts of Time (1981)
- Entropy in Relation to Incomplete Knowledge (1985) ISBN 9780521256773, OCLC 11398680
