= Canadian Society for Civil Engineering =

Canadian professional association

- Formation: 4 October 1972
- Type: Professional association
- Headquarters: 203 Hymus Boulevard, Suite 200, Pointe Claire, Quebec
- Fields: Civil engineering
- Website: csce.ca

The Canadian Society for Civil Engineering (CSCE; French: Société canadienne de génie civil) was founded in 1887 as the Canadian Society of Civil Engineers, renamed in 1918 as the Engineering Institute of Canada (EIC), and re-established in June 1972 as a member society of the EIC under the slightly different but current name. It promotes advances in the field of civil engineering including geotechnical engineering, structural engineering, hydrotechnical engineering, environmental engineering, transportation engineering and surveying and geomatics engineering. Members who are professional civil engineers are usually categorized and may use the post nominals as associates (AMCSCE), members (MCSCE) or fellows (FCSCE). The grade of "Fellow" is achieved through election by one's peers within the CSCE.

There are also student chapters of the Canadian Society for Civil Engineering at many universities throughout the country including the University of Toronto, University of Waterloo, McGill University and the University of British Columbia.

In the year 2019, the CSCE named its best paper award in construction after Osama Moselhi. Moselhi Best Paper Award is offered every two years in the construction specialty conference.

== Leadership ==
Past presidents of the Society have been:

- Founding – John Bell
- 1972 – Camille Arthur Dagenais
- 1973 – Harold Lawson Macklin
- 1974 – Eric C. Garland
- 1975 – David James Laurie Laurie Kennedy
- 1976 – John Priestman
- 1977 – Peter R. Hart
- 1978 – Peter R. Hart
- 1979 – Jerrold Ward Disher
- 1980 – Marcel Frenette
- 1981 – Peter M. Wright
- 1982 – William Alfred Hallam Filer
- 1983 – Ira MacIntosh Beattie
- 1984 – Clifford D. Smith
- 1985 – M. Saeed Mirza
- 1986 – Chris D. Thompson
- 1987 – Daniel W. Smith
- 1988 – Peter Smith
- 1989 – Stephen George Revay
- 1990 – H. Keith Bowers
- 1991 – Martin C. Jones
- 1992 – Leslie Gordon Jaeger
- 1993 – Claude D. Johnson
- 1994 – P. Daniel Burns
- 1995 – Jules Houde
- 1996 – Michael C. Ircha
- 1997 – Mahbub-Ul Hosain
- 1998 – Alan R. Perks
- 1999 – Georges Archer
- 2000 – Robert Edmund Loov
- 2001 – Ronald Townsend
- 2002 – Denis Beaulieu
- 2003 – David Innes
- 2004 – Cathy Lynn Borbely
- 2005 – Alistair MacKenzie
- 2006 – A. Ghani Razaqpur
- 2007 – Lloyd M. Waugh
- 2008 – Guy Gosselin
- 2009 – Gordon Jin
- 2010 – Vic Perry
- 2011 – Randy Pickle
- 2012 – James Kells
