= Zheng Guangzhao =

Chinese politician

Zheng Guangzhao (born September 1966, 郑光照), a native of Liquan, Shaanxi, is a politician in the People's Republic of China.

== Biography ==
In September 1988, he graduated from Shaanxi College of Finance and Economics, now the Industrial Accounting department of Xi'an Jiaotong University). In November 1997, he served as deputy governor of Changwu County, Shaanxi Province, deputy secretary of CCP Xunyi County Committee and governor of Xunyi County, secretary of Xunyi County Party Committee. In November 2006, he was appointed as a member of the Standing Committee of Ankang Municipal Party Committee and secretary of the Discipline Inspection Commission of the Municipal Party Committee of Ankang. In June 2012, he was appointed as a member of the Standing Committee of the Weinan Municipal Party Committee and secretary of the Discipline Inspection Commission of the Municipal Party Committee. In February 2013, he was appointed as a member of the Standing Committee of Weinan Municipal Party Committee, deputy party secretary and executive deputy mayor. In July 2016, he became deputy secretary of the CCP Shangluo Municipal Committee. In August, he became deputy secretary and mayor of Shangluo Municipal. In June 2021, he became secretary and mayor of Shangluo Municipal.

Zhang was a delegate to the 13th National People's Congress in 2018. In July 2022, he was appointed of the party group and vice-chairman of the People's Government of the Inner Mongolia Autonomous Region; director, inspector general, and party secretary of the Inner Mongolia Public Security Department; and deputy secretary of the Party Committee of the Autonomous Region's Politics and Law Committee.

Government offices
Preceded by Heng Xiaofan	Director of the Public Security Department of the Inner Mongolia Autonomous Region; July 2022 -	Succeeded by Incumbent
