= Leslie Jaeger =

British and Canadian academic and engineer

Leslie Gordon Jaeger CM FCAE FEIC FCSCE FRSE (28 January 1926–20 August 2013) was a distinguished British and Canadian academic and engineer.

== Life ==
Jaeger was born on 28 January 1926, in Southport, England. He graduated from the University of Cambridge (Gonville & Caius College), and then served for two years as a lieutenant in the Royal Navy. His doctorate and DSc were then from the University of London. He was successively Director of Studies in Engineering at Magdalene College, Cambridge; Regius Professor of Engineering at the University of Edinburgh (1963); Professor of Civil Engineering and Applied Mechanics at McGill University, Canada; Dean of the Faculty of Engineering at the University of New Brunswick, Canada; Vice President (Academic) at Acadia University, Canada; and Vice President (Research) at the Technical University of Nova Scotia, Canada.

A specialist in advanced structural analysis, with expertise in earthquake engineering and highway bridges, Jaeger was Technical Editor of the Ontario Highway Bridge Design Code, and its successor the Canadian Highway Bridge Design Code, since 1977. He served the Canadian Society for Civil Engineering (CSCE) in a number of capacities, and was its President from 1992–93. Jaeger authored or co-authored nine books and published extensively in the technical literature. He served the Natural Sciences and Engineering Research Council of Canada (NSERC) in a number of capacities over the years, latterly as Chair of the Cooperative Research Opportunities Committee.

Jaeger was appointed Member of the Order of Canada in 2002. He held Honorary Doctorates in Engineering from Carleton University, Memorial University of Newfoundland and the Technical University of Nova Scotia. Other awards included the Gzowski Medal of the Engineering Institute of Canada (EIC), the Pratley Award of CSCE, the A B Sanderson Award of CSCE, the Julian C Smith Medal of EIC, the Association of Professional Engineers of Nova Scotia Award for distinction in Engineering, the Nova Award for Innovation, the Lieutenant Governor of Nova Scotia Award for Excellence in Engineering, and the CSCE Award for Outstanding Contributions to Bridge Engineering. He was an Honorary Professor of Civil Engineering at Tongji University, Shanghai and Honorary President of the Usman Institute of Technology, Karachi.

In 1966 Jaeger was elected a Fellow of the Royal Society of Edinburgh (FRSE). Subsequently he was elected Fellow of the CSCE, the EIC and the Canadian Academy of Engineering. He was a Former Fellow of the Institution of Civil Engineers (London).

Jaeger ended his career as Emeritus Research Professor of Civil Engineering and Engineering Mathematics at Dalhousie University, Canada.

In 1948 Jaeger married Annie Sylvia Dyson, and together they had two daughters. After Dyson's death he married Kathleen Grant in 1981.

He died on 20 August 2013, aged 87.
