= Joseph McGeough =

British academic

Joseph Anthony McGeough FREng FRSE is a former Regius Professor of Engineering, and now an honorary professorial fellow, in the School of Engineering at the University of Edinburgh.

== Biography ==
McGeough was born in Kilwinning, Scotland, on 29 May 1940. A graduate of the University of Glasgow (BSc, 1963; PhD, 1967) and the University of Aberdeen (DSc, 1982), he gained industrial training as an undergraduate vacation apprentice for a firm of electrical contractors at ICI Nobel Division, and with Cossor Radar and Electronics, Harlow. Following graduation he worked for International Research and Development Ltd, Newcastle, as a research metallurgist. He then held research appointments as a Demonstrator and senior research fellow at respectively the University of Leicester, the University of Queensland and the University of Edinburgh

He was a Lecturer (1972–1977), then senior lecturer (1977–1980) and reader (1980–1983) in engineering at the University of Edinburgh, before being appointed in 1983 to the Regius Chair of Engineering at the University of Edinburgh. While Regius Professor he also served for eight years as the head of the Department of Mechanical Engineering.

His main field of research is manufacturing; his research outcomes are published in journals including the Proceedings of the Institution of Mechanical Engineers, Proceedings of the Royal Society, the Journal of the Institute for Mathematics and its Applications, and, latterly, in the Journal of Bone and Joint Surgery. McGeough's books include Principles of Electrochemical Machining (1974), Advanced Methods of Machining (1988), Micromachining of Engineering Materials (editor, 2001) and The Engineering of Human Joint Replacements (2013). He is the author of the entry on Electroforming for the Encyclopedia of Production Engineering (2013), and a volume editor for Comprehensive Materials Processing (2014). The IMechE and the Society for Underwater Technology have awarded him prizes for his researches. He held a Royal Society/SERC (now EPSRC) Industrial Fellowship between 1987 and 1989, and has been the director of three spin-off companies.

McGeough is a Fellow of the Institution of Mechanical Engineers, the Royal Society of Edinburgh, the International Academy for Production Engineering, and the Royal Academy of Engineering. He is a member of the Royal Institution of Great Britain. He has served as President of the IMechE (2019), chair of its Professional Publishing Board, and of its International Strategy Board. He has held visiting appointments at the University of Naples "Federico 2", Monash University, Tokyo University of Agriculture and Technology, and Dublin City University. He is an honorary professor of Nanjing Aeronautical and Astronautical University.

When he was a student he gained a number of county, universities and national athletics championship awards, and was the winner of an Australian Universities’ soccer championship medal. He was secretary and vice-captain of Glasgow University Athletics, and became an honorary vice-president of Aberdeen University Athletics Association.

More recently he served as chairman for Aberdeen Dyce Academy College council, and president for Edinburgh Colinton Literary Society (including its centenary year). He gives lectures on science to the community, including the National Trust for Scotland, and the Royal Society of Edinburgh.

He has been married for more than 40 years, with three children and six grandchildren.
