= School of GeoSciences, University of Edinburgh =

Coordinates: 55.94811°N 3.18355°W

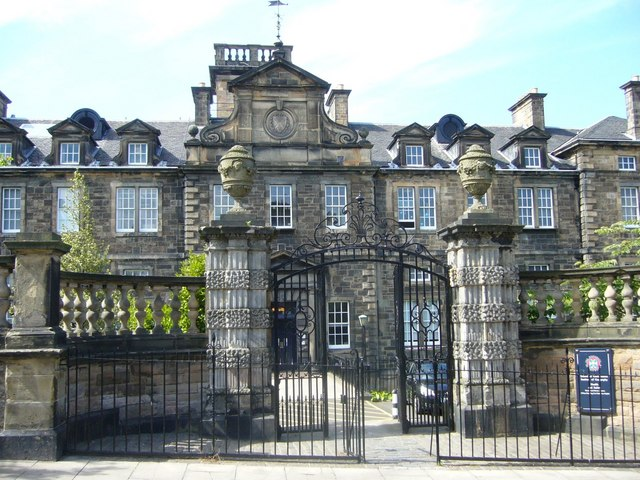
The building which houses the university's School of GeoSciences Institute of Geography at High School Yards, which was once part of the Edinburgh Royal Infirmary

The School of GeoSciences is an academic department within the College of Science and Engineering at the University of Edinburgh in Scotland.

It was formed in 2002 by the merger of four departments. It is split between the King's Buildings and the Central Area of the university. The institutes of Ecological Sciences and Earth Science are located at the King's Buildings, whilst the Institute of Geography is located on Drummond Street in the Central Area. In 2013 the department was ranked 8th best place to study geography in the country by The Guardian University Rankings, down from 2nd in 2006.

The school is ranked as one of the best in the UK for Earth Sciences. A 2008 Research Assessment Exercise assessment ranked the "Earth Systems and Environmental Science" department as the best in the UK by number of world leading research and staff. Its Geography department was ranked 15th in the world according to the 2015 QS rankings.

There are over 1100 undergraduate students and 250 postgraduate students in the School of GeoSciences. There are also around 100 research and teaching staff within the school.

The School collaborates with the University of Edinburgh Business School and the School of Economics, to offer a Carbon Management MSc degree, the first in the world, which has students from over 20 countries. The school also has exchange programmes though the Erasmus programme, in addition to universities in Canada, the United States, Australia and New Zealand.

The head of the School of GeoSciences is currently Professor Bryne Ngwenya. Famous recent alumni of the School include former BP chief executive Tony Hayward. Former Rector of the university Peter McColl matriculated at one of the predecessors, the Department of Geography.

Competition for entry is highly selective, in 2010, the School received 2221 applications, but only 275 offers were made, representing a 16.9% of an applicant receiving an offer. The school currently offers 11 undergraduate courses and a range of postgraduate degrees.
