= Wayne State University College of Engineering =

Coordinates: 42°21′19.8″N 83°04′14.0″W

- Type: Public engineering school
- Established: 1933
- Parent institution: Wayne State University
- Dean: Ali Abolmaali
- Location: Detroit, Michigan, USA
- Campus: Urban
- Website: engineering.wayne.edu

The Wayne State University College of Engineering is the engineering school of Wayne State University, a public university in Detroit, Michigan, United States.

As of 2019, the college has about 29,000 alumni. Founded in 1933, the College of Engineering has grown to include a variety of programs ranging from civil engineering, biomedical engineering and many others. It is located on Wayne State's main campus in Detroit in a building shared with the Danto Engineering Development Center. The current dean of engineering is Ali Abolmaali.

== History ==
The Wayne State University College of Engineering had its unofficial beginning in 1920, when co-founder Ernest Drake began teaching the first engineering courses that were a part of the university's chemistry program. Professors Arthur R. Carr and Drake officially founded the college in 1933 and began with only four disciplines: chemical, electrical, mechanical and civil engineering. The classes and the offices were in the Old Main building and several old houses within the neighborhood. By 1937, the college grew to 632 full-time students, with 24 faculty members. To date the College of Engineering has expanded to comprise 135 full-time faculty and 3,493 undergraduate and graduate students.

== Academics ==
The college offers the bachelor of science, master of science, and doctorate of philosophy degrees in many engineering disciplines. It also offers graduate certificates and other non-degree programs.

In fall 2020, the College of Engineering enrolled 3,368 students, including 2,408 full-time students and 960 part-time students. This comprised 2,561 undergraduate students and 807 graduate students. In 2019–20, the college awarded 895 degrees and certificates.
