= Ronald Arnold =

British engineer (1908–1963)

Ronald Nathan Arnold
- Born: 23 December 1908; Glasgow, Scotland
- Died: 30 December 1963 (aged 55)
- Education: Royal Technical College, Glasgow; University of Sheffield; University of Illinois
- Occupations: Engineer, professor
- Known for: Research in fluid dynamics, gyrostatics, and applied mechanics
- Title: Regius Professor of Engineering, University of Edinburgh
- Term: 1946–1963
- Spouse: Jessie Beattie Blake
- Children: 1
- Awards: Thomas Hawksley Gold Medal (1946); Institution Prize, IMechE (1952); T Bernard Hall Prize, IMechE (1957)

Ronald Nathan Arnold (23 December 1908 – 30 December 1963) PhD (Sheffield) MS (Illinois) DSc (Glasgow 1943) DEng (Sheffield 1947) MIMechE MICivilE was a distinguished British engineer.

== Life ==
Born in Glasgow on 23 December 1908, he was schooled at Albert Road Academy and Shawlands Academy in Glasgow before completing, in 1932, a BSc with first-class honours in mechanical engineering at the Royal Technical College (now the University of Strathclyde), Glasgow. He graduated with a PhD from Sheffield University in 1934, and (as a Commonwealth Fund Fellow) an MS from Illinois in 1936, where he studied impact stresses in beams. His early training was conducted with Mirrlees Watson Ltd, in Glasgow.

As a mechanical engineer he was appointed as assistant lecturer in engineering and applied mechanics from 1936 to 1940 in the Royal Technical College in Glasgow. For his research on ships' propellers, he was awarded jointly with a colleague the gold medal of the Institution of Engineers and Shipbuilders in Scotland and the Thomas Lowe Gray prize of the Institution of Mechanical Engineers.

His war service, from 1939 to 1945, was conducted in the Research Department of the Metropolitan-Vickers Electrical Company. He was subsequently appointed in 1944 as Professor of Engineering at University College, Swansea. Finally, he was appointed Regius Professor of Engineering in the University of Edinburgh in 1946, a position he retained until his death in 1963. At Edinburgh, he instituted two postgraduate schools, one in electronics and radio (1950), the other in applied dynamics (1957).

An expert in fluid dynamics, metals, and stress analysis, Arnold devoted much time to research into mechanical vibration, dynamics, the properties of metals, gyrostatics, and foundations. He published numerous papers in Engineering, the Proceedings of the Institution of Mechanical Engineers, the Proceedings of the Royal Society, and other journals.

He was recognized with honorary doctorates from the Universities of Glasgow and Sheffield, as well as the Thomas Hawksley Gold Medal (1946), the Institution Prize from the Institution of Mechanical Engineers (1952), and the T Bernard Hall Prize (Institution of Mechanical Engineers) (1957). He was elected FRSE in 1947.

Arnold died on 30 December 1963, survived by his widow, Jessie Beattie Blake, and a son.

== Publications ==
"Gyrodynamics and its Engineering Applications", published with Leonard Maunder by Academic Press in 1961.
