= Scottish Science Advisory Council =

- Abbreviation: SSAC
- Formation: 7 May 2002; 24 years ago
- Type: GO
- Purpose: Science advice and strategy for Scotland
- Headquarters: Room 1N:11, St Andrew's House
- Location: Regent Road, Edinburgh, EH1 3DG
- Region served: Scotland
- Members: Scottish scientists
- Executive: SSAC Secretariat
- Chairman: Paul Boyle
- Parent organization: Scottish Government
- Website: www.scottishscience.org.uk

The Scottish Science Advisory Council is a government organisation that is Scotland's highest level advisory body for science, engineering and technology.

The group of experts provides independent advice to the Scottish Government. Members are appointed by the Cabinet Secretary for Education and Lifelong Learning. It acts in an advisory role and does not direct any research funding, which comes from the UK Research Councils.

== History ==
Scotland has a proud tradition of science research and innovation, but this tends to be exclusively found in its main universities. R&D in Scottish industry is lower than the rest of the UK (RUK). Scotland has 10% of the population of the UK but produces 30% of the PhDs in microbiology and genetics. The University of Dundee is noted for its work in biochemistry.

However, in physical sciences, from 1999 to 2004, there was a 12% drop in Scottish graduates, and a 17% drop in engineering and technology graduates. In the post-war years, and up to the early 1990s, Scotland was producing more than its fair share of science and engineering graduates; it was seen a popular and challenging option, although mainly among males. Now, proportionately more children at Scottish schools are perceived to be indifferent to the challenges that science presents. Older science teachers at Scottish schools are not being replaced in the number needed. Why Science Matters, the 2003 report, found that Scotland was short of around 350 chemistry teachers and 200 physics teachers.

The organisation was announced in August 2001, and founded by the Royal Society of Edinburgh, with funding from the Scottish Executive.

From 1 January 2007, it moved to the Office of the Chief Scientific Adviser. Previously it had been at the Royal Society of Edinburgh.

== See also ==
- Scottish Science Trust
- Chief Scientific Adviser for Scotland
- Scottish Council for Development and Industry
- Campaign for Science and Engineering
