= King's Buildings =

Campus at the University of Edinburgh

Coordinates: 55°55′22″N 3°10′30″W

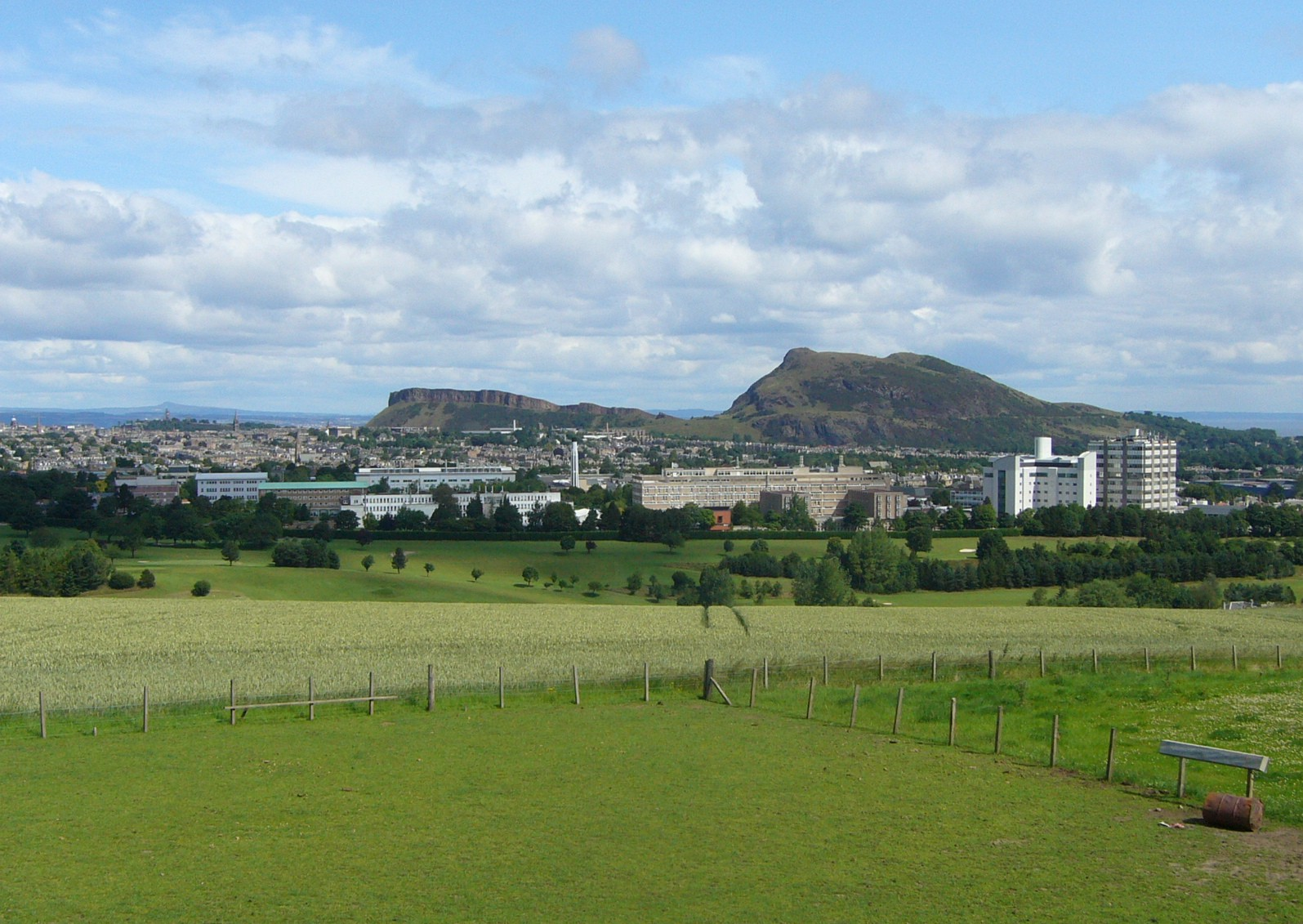
View of King's Buildings from the Braid Hills

The King's Buildings (colloquially known as KB) is a campus of the University of Edinburgh in Scotland. Located in the suburb of Blackford, the site contains most of the schools within the College of Science and Engineering, excepting only the School of Informatics and part of the School of Geosciences, which are located at the central George Square campus. Scotland's Rural College (SRUC) and Biomathematics and Statistics Scotland (BioSS) also have facilities there.

The campus lies south of West Mains Road, west of Mayfield Road and east of Blackford Hill, about 2 miles (3.2 km) south of George Square. It is bounded to the south and west by Craigmillar Park Golf Club.

== History ==
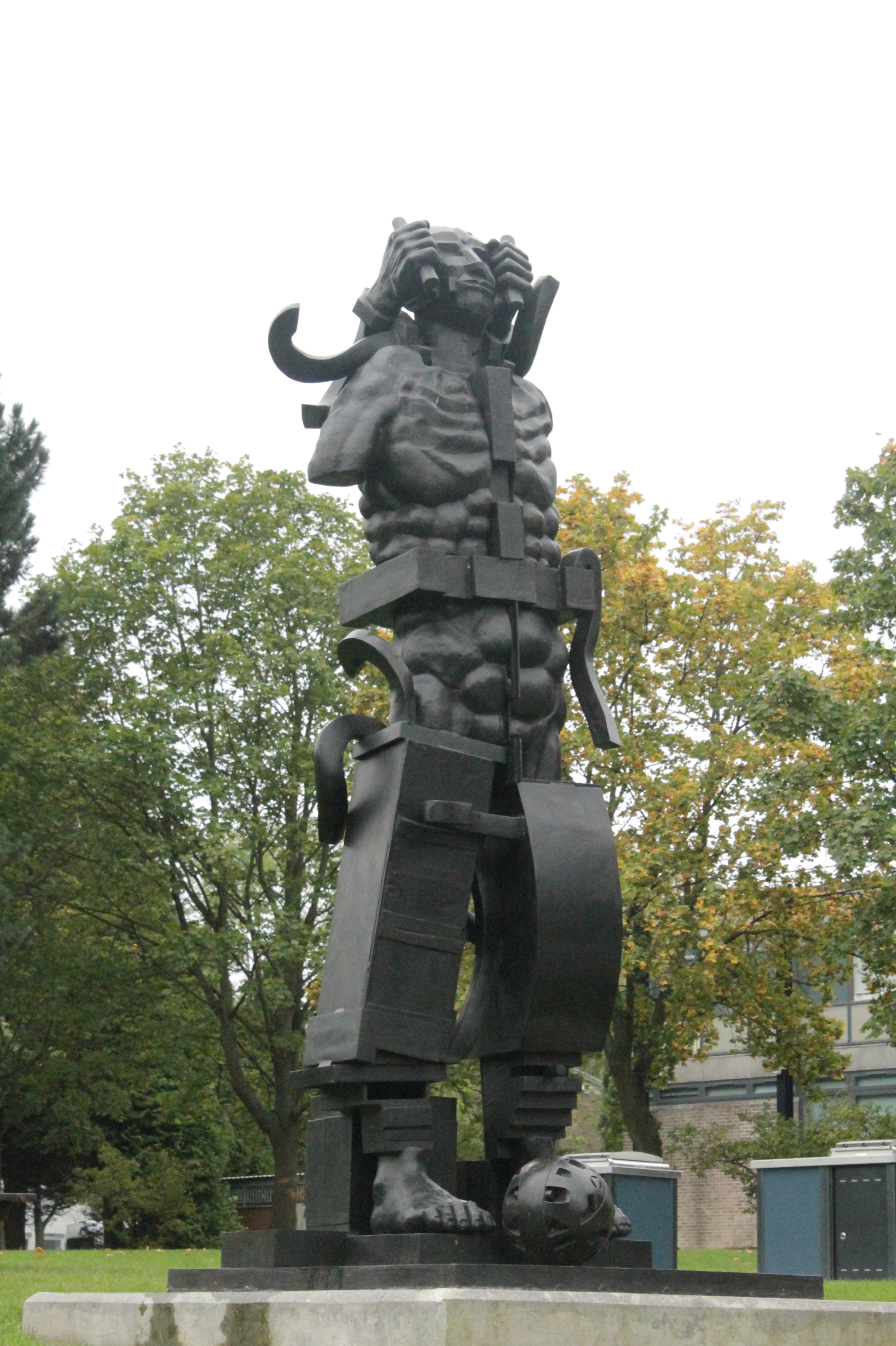
Paolozzi statue at King's Buildings

In 1919 Edinburgh University bought the land of West Mains Farm in the south of the city with the intention of building a satellite campus specialising in the Sciences. The first building was the Chemistry Building (renamed the Joseph Black Building) designed by Arthur Forman Balfour Paul in 1919. Building started in 1920 and was completed after 1924 by John Fraser Matthew. This was followed by the Zoology Building (renamed the Ashworth Laboratories) dating from 1929, also by Matthew.

The name "King's Buildings" is a reference to then-king George V.

During World War II, the Genetics Institute part of King's Buildings was used as the location for the first War Office Selection Board.

In 1968, the 10-story Darwin Tower was constructed at the campus, and became home to the Institute of Cell Biology. Kenneth and Lady Noreen Murray later made breakthroughs in genetic engineering here. Plans were announced to redevelop the site in March 2024, led by BMJ Architects. Dismantling of the building commenced in 2024 to make way for the New Darwin building; this was undertaken by Rhodar.

On 5 August 2014, the FloWave Ocean Energy Research Facility was inaugurated by Amber Rudd, then UK Secretary of State for Energy and Climate Change. FloWave is a world-unique, 25-metre (82 ft) diameter wave and current tank, primarily focused on testing marine energy technologies and projects.

In 2021, the University of Edinburgh celebrated more than 100 years of the site with their KB101 campaign which included a lecture series and newly commissioned artworks by Katie Paterson.

In 2022, the new Nucleus building opened. This is a combined learning, teaching, and social hub at the heart of the campus. The £34m building was designed by architect Sheppard Robson, and built by McLaughlin & Harvey during the COVID-19 pandemic. In September 2025, the building was shortlisted for the Royal Incorporation of Architects in Scotland Andrew Doolan Best Building in Scotland Award.

In April 2026, the Engineering Forum building opened, home to the School of Engineering’s Institute for Energy Systems. The 5-story building hosts teaching and office spaces, as well as five research laboratories. It was the seventh building constructed for the university by McLaughlin & Harvey.

== Street and building names ==
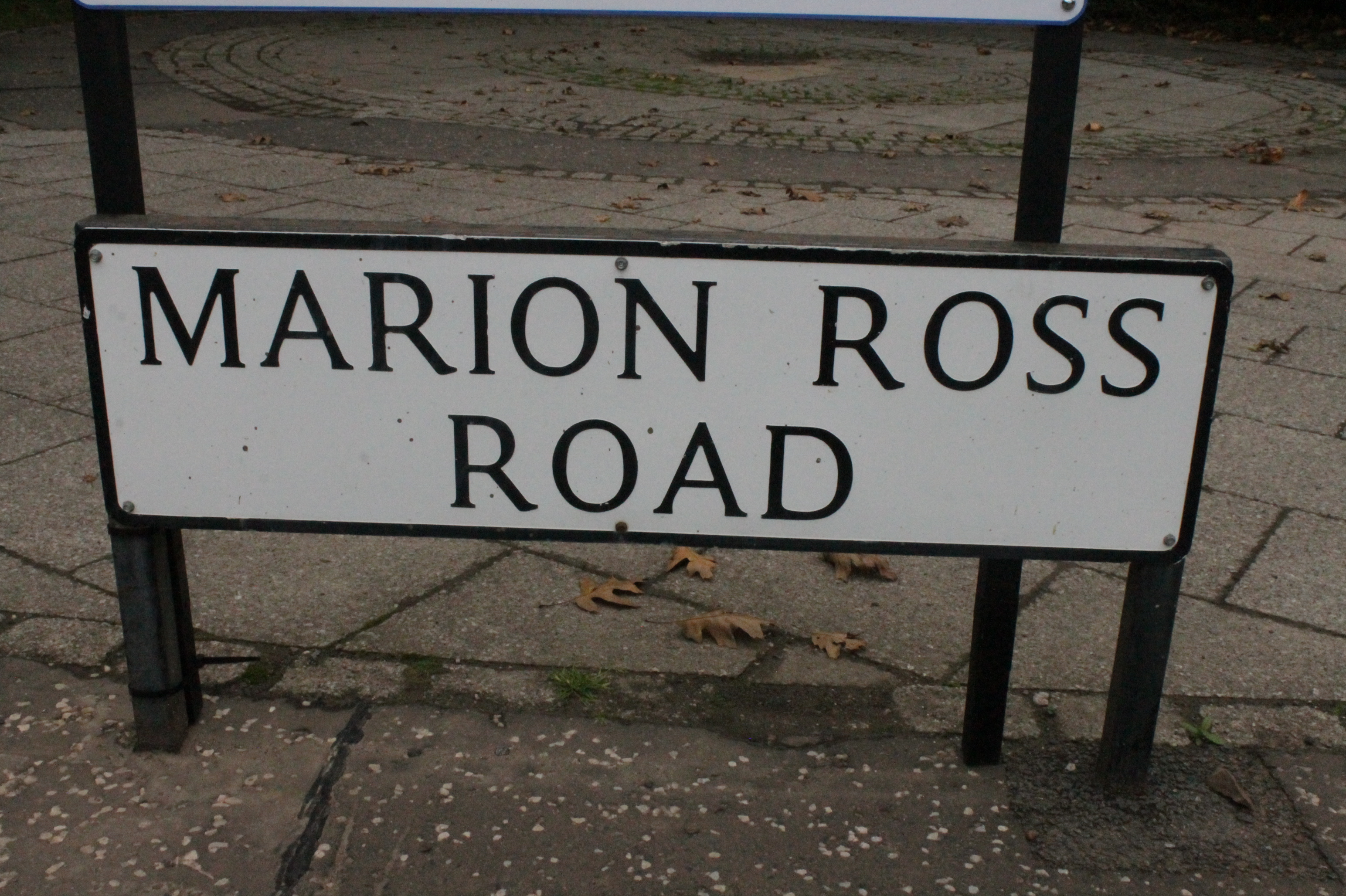
Marion Ross Road sign

All the campus properties shared one of two addresses until, in 2014, the University approached the City of Edinburgh Council, as the road naming authority, with a request to name all the individual roads within the campus to honour famous scientists and mathematicians associated with the University. When the proposed changes were discussed in City of Edinburgh Development Management Sub-Committee, it was pointed out that some of the names were overly long and cumbersome. Two of the proposed names were rejected as unsuitable as Christina Miller was deemed to be too similar sounding to Christie Miller, who already appears in three street names; and Robert Edwards did not meet the Council’s 10-year waiting period for deceased people. The University eventually substituted Marion Ross Road for Christina Miller Road and James Dewar Road for Robert Edwards Road.

The final agreed street system was:

- Charlotte Auerbach Road
- Thomas Bayes Road
- Max Born Crescent
- David Brewster Road
- Alexander Crum Brown Road
- James Dewar Road
- James Hutton Road
- KB Square
- Colin MacLaurin Road
- Marion Ross Road
- Peter Guthrie Tait Road
- Robert Stevenson Road
- Nicholas Kemmer Road

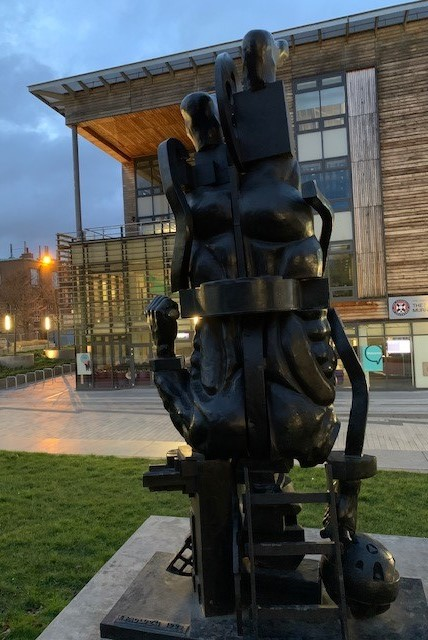
Statues at Kings Buildings

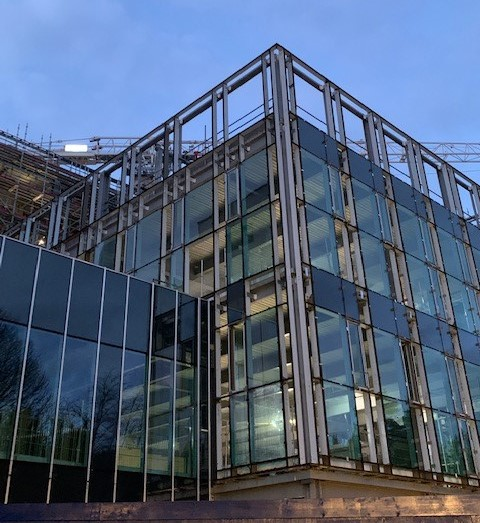
New KB Nucleus Phase 1 Building

== Buildings ==
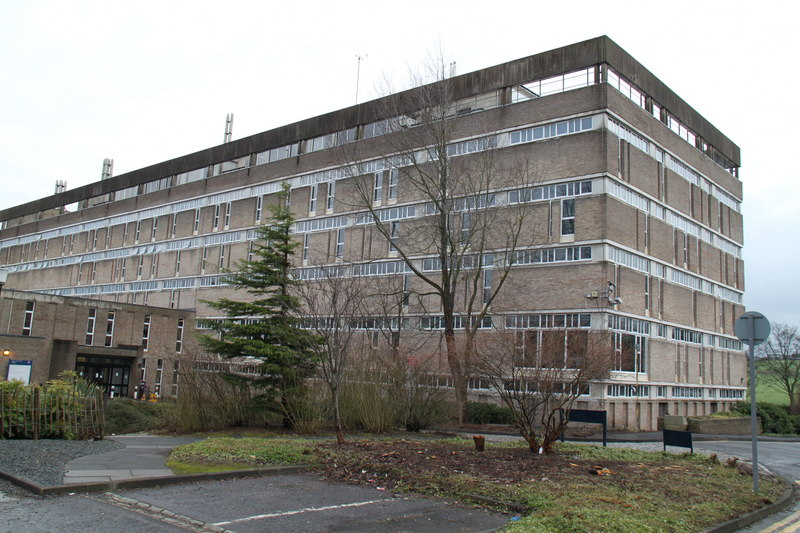
James Clerk Maxwell Building

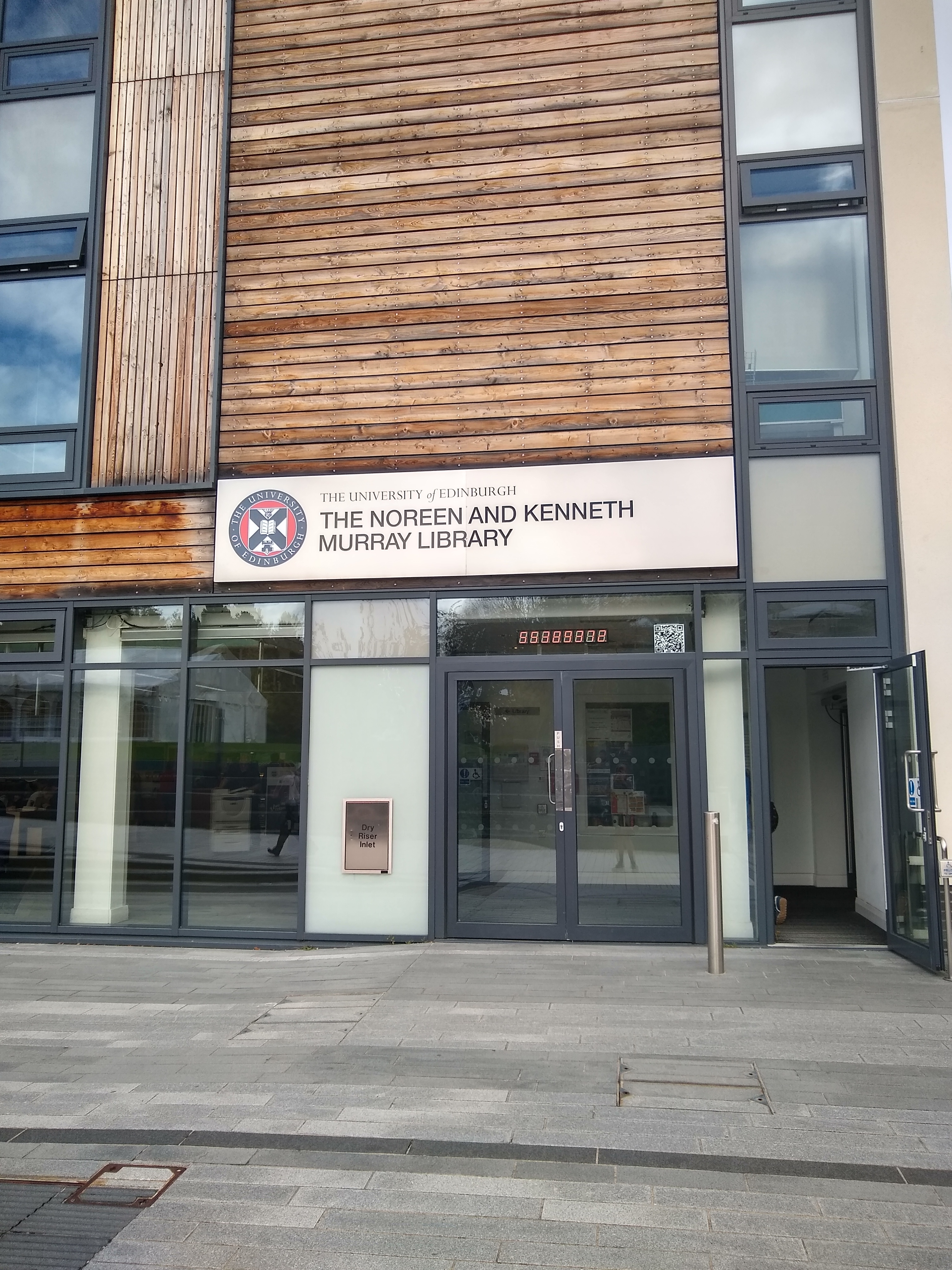
The Noreen and Kenneth Murray Library

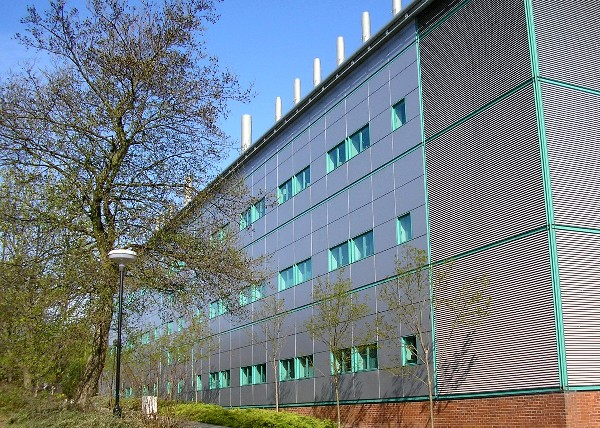
Christina Miller Building

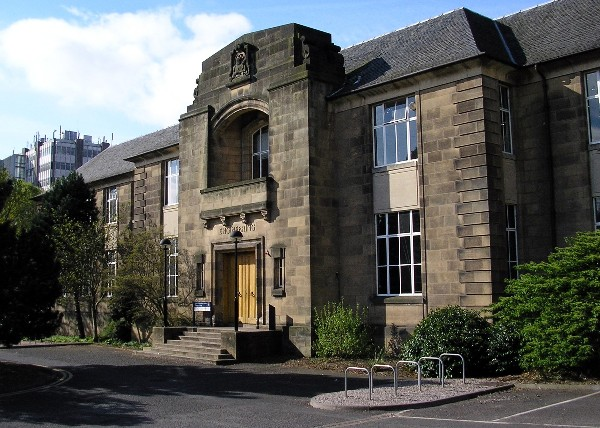
Sanderson Building (Engineering)

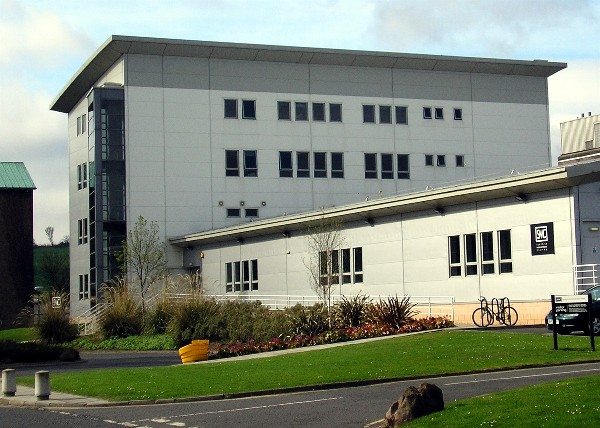
Scottish Microelectronics Centre

Building names at KB reflect the spectrum of British science:

- Alexander Graham Bell Building
- Alrick Building
- Ann Walker Building
- Ashworth Laboratories
- Biospace
- Centre for Science at Extreme Conditions
- Christina Miller Building
- Computing Services
- Crew Building
- Crew Laboratory (previously the William Dudgeon Labs and earlier Mouse House)
- Daniel Rutherford Building
- Darwin Building
- Engineering Lecture Theatre
- Erskine Williamson Building
- Faraday Building
- Fleeming Jenkin Building
- Grant Institute
- Hudson Beare Building
- James Clerk Maxwell Building
- John Muir Building
- John Murray Labs
- Joseph Black Building
- Kenneth Denbigh Building
- King's Buildings Centre
- King's Buildings House
- March Building
- Mary Brück Building
- Michael Swann Building
- Murchison House
- Noreen and Kenneth Murray Library
- The Nucleus
- Ocean Energy Research Facility
- Peter Wilson Building (Note: The Peter Wilson Building is where Scotland's Rural College (SRUC) is located on campus.)
- Robertson Engineering & Science Library
- Roger Land Building
- Sanderson Building
- Scottish Microelectronics Centre
- Structures Lab
- Swann Building
- Waddington Building
- William Rankine Building

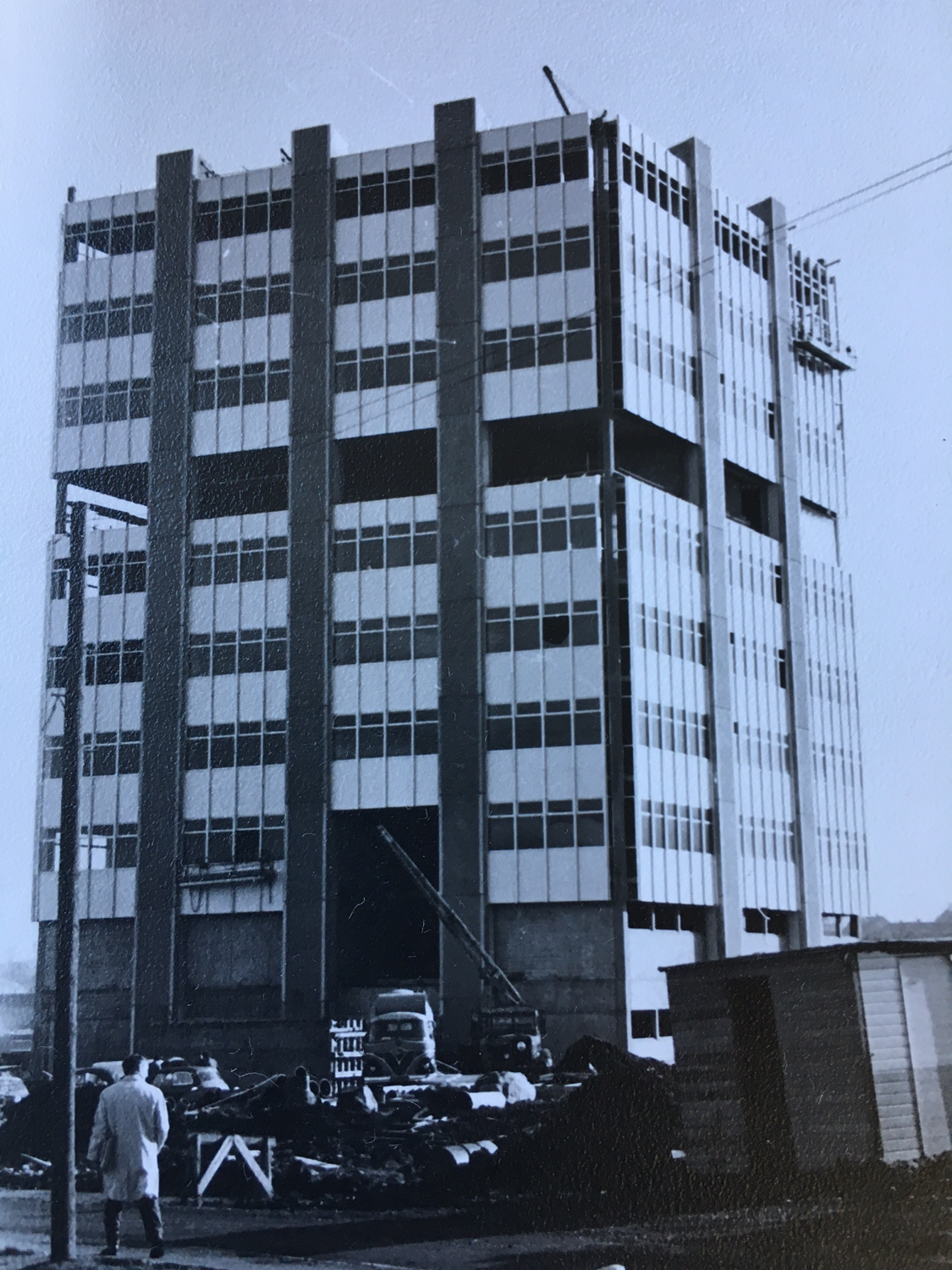
Darwin Building in 1967

In 2019 the data centre in the James Clerk Maxwell Building was named in honour of Mary Somerville and in 2020 the IT skills training room was named in honour of Xia Peisu.

== Other facilities ==
- King's Buildings House, also known as KB House, is the student union at King's Buildings, run by Edinburgh University Students' Association (EUSA). The Mayfield Common Room serves hot food and drinks on the ground floor. The union is also home to The Advice Place student advisory service and KB Gym, which includes two badminton and two squash courts. KB House previously included a full servery, the Common Room and Kitchen, serving a wider variety of hot food upstairs, and the KB Centre Shop run by EUSA which stocked convenience products, alongside hot drinks, made-to-order sandwiches and hot food to take away, however these have since closed.
- Cafés include Element in Murchison House, The Magnet Café in the James Clerk Maxwell Building, KB Café in the Noreen and Kenneth Murray Library, XY Café in the Roger Land Building, and The Eng Inn in the Hudson Beare Building. The Upstairs Café in the Swann Building and Brücks Café in the Mary Brück building have closed.
- The Arcadia Nursery opened in August 2014, designed by Malcolm Fraser Architects, it was shortlisted for the Royal Incorporation of Architects in Scotland (RIAS) awards in 2015. It features three linked open play areas with outdoor spaces.

== King's Buildings 5 Mile Road Race ==
The KB 5 Road Race is organised every year by the Edinburgh University Hare and Hounds Running Club. It is usually held in late February or early March. The race starts and finishes inside the King's Buildings campus. The course consists of a 5-mile (8.0 km) road loop around the streets of south Edinburgh, with quite a few hills, though none of them steep. The race is popular with student and local club runners and usually attracts around 250 participants.
