= Architecture of Aberdeen =

Buildings in Aberdeen, Scotland (UK)

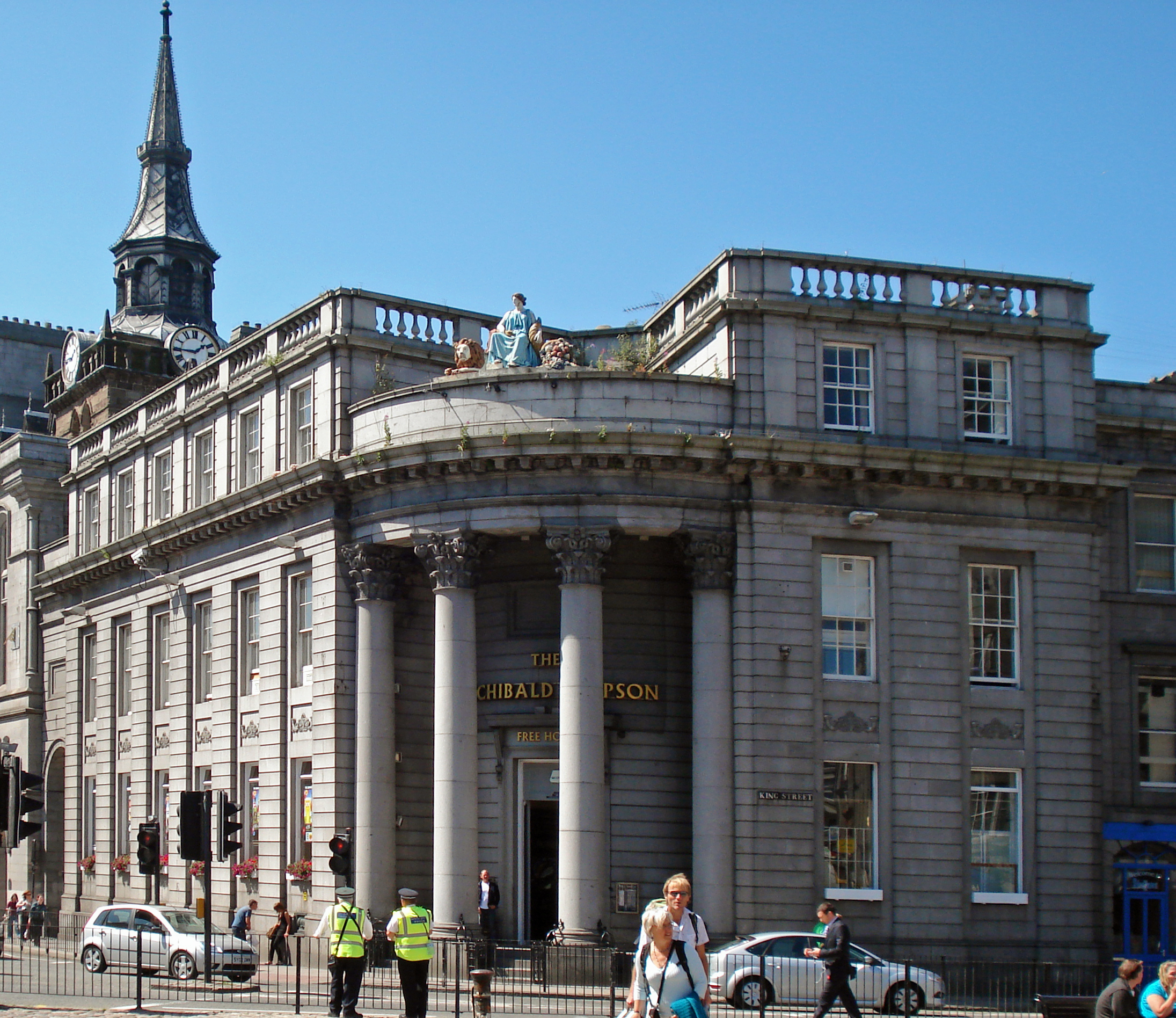
The old North of Scotland Bank by Archibald Simpson viewed from the Castlegate

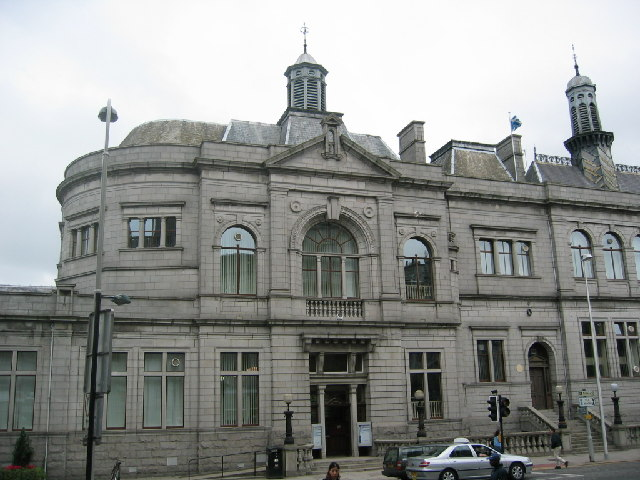
Central Library

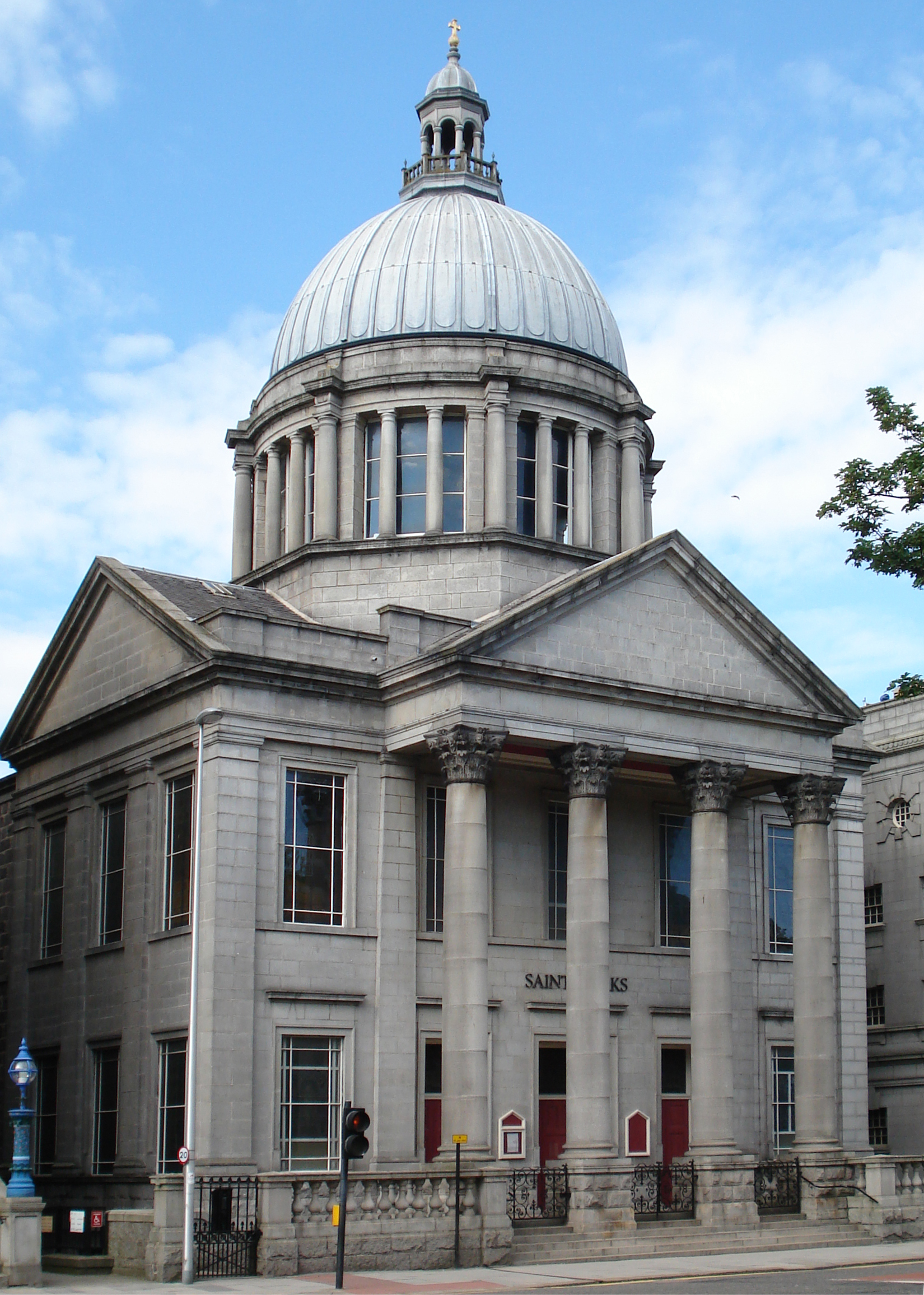
St Mark's Church, Rosemount Viaduct

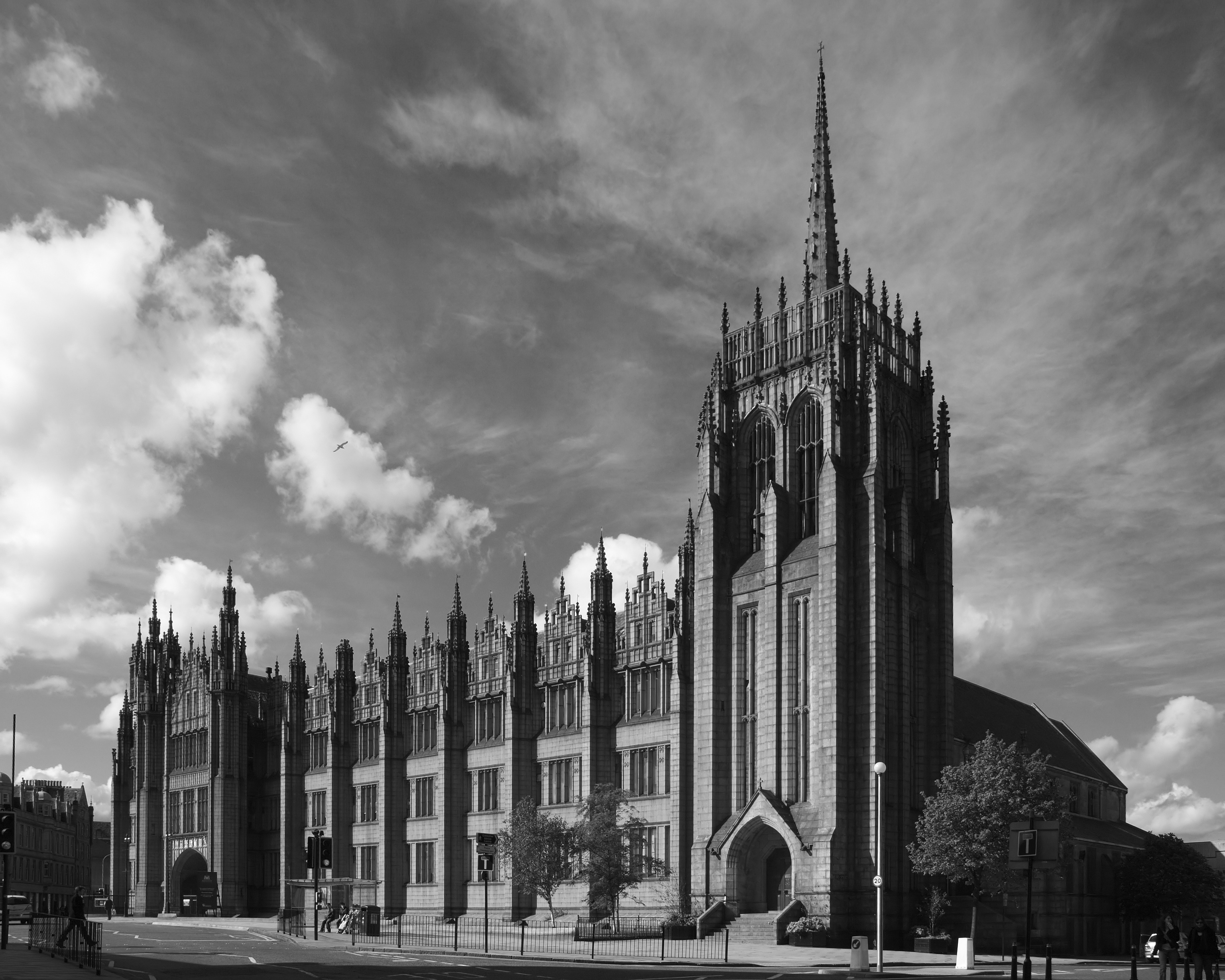
Marischal College

The architecture of Aberdeen, Scotland, is known for the use of granite as the principal construction material. The stone, which has been quarried in and around the city, has given Aberdeen the epithet The Granite City, or more romantically, and less commonly used, the Silver City, after the mica in the stone which sparkles in the sun.

The hard grey stone is one of the most durable materials available and helps to explain why the city's buildings look brand-new when they have been newly cleaned and the mortar has been pointed. Unlike other Scottish cities where less durable stone, such as sandstone, has been used, the buildings do not weather, and need very little maintenance.

== Union Street ==
Union Street runs for 0.8 miles (1.3 km), is 70 feet (21 m) wide and originally contained the principal shops and most of the public buildings, all granite. Part of the street crosses the Denburn ravine (utilised for the line of the Great North of Scotland Railway) by Union Bridge, a fine granite arch of 132 feet (40 m) span, with portions of the older town still fringing the gorge, 50 feet (15 m) below the level of Union Street. The latter was built between 1801 and 1805, and named after the Acts of Union 1800 with Ireland.

Amongst the notable buildings in the street are the Town and County Bank, the Music Hall, the Trinity Hall of the incorporated trades (originating between 1398 and 1527), now a shopping mall; the Palace Hotel; the former office of the Northern Assurance Company, and the National Bank of Scotland.

In Castle Street, a continuation eastwards of Union Street, is the new Town House, the headquarters of the city council. Designed by Peddie and Kinnear and built between 1868 and 1874, it is one of the most splendid granite edifices in Scotland, in Flemish-Gothic style in recognition of close trade links between Aberdeen and Flanders, it contains the great hall, with an open timber ceiling and oak-panelled walls; the Sheriff Court House; the Town and County Hall, with portraits of Prince Albert, the 4th Earl of Aberdeen, various Lord Provosts and other distinguished citizens. In the vestibule of the entrance corridor stands a suit of black armour, believed to have been worn by Provost Sir Robert Davidson, who fought in the Battle of Harlaw in 1411. On the south-western corner is the 210 ft (64 m) West Tower, with its prominent bartizans, which commands a fine view of the city and surrounding country.

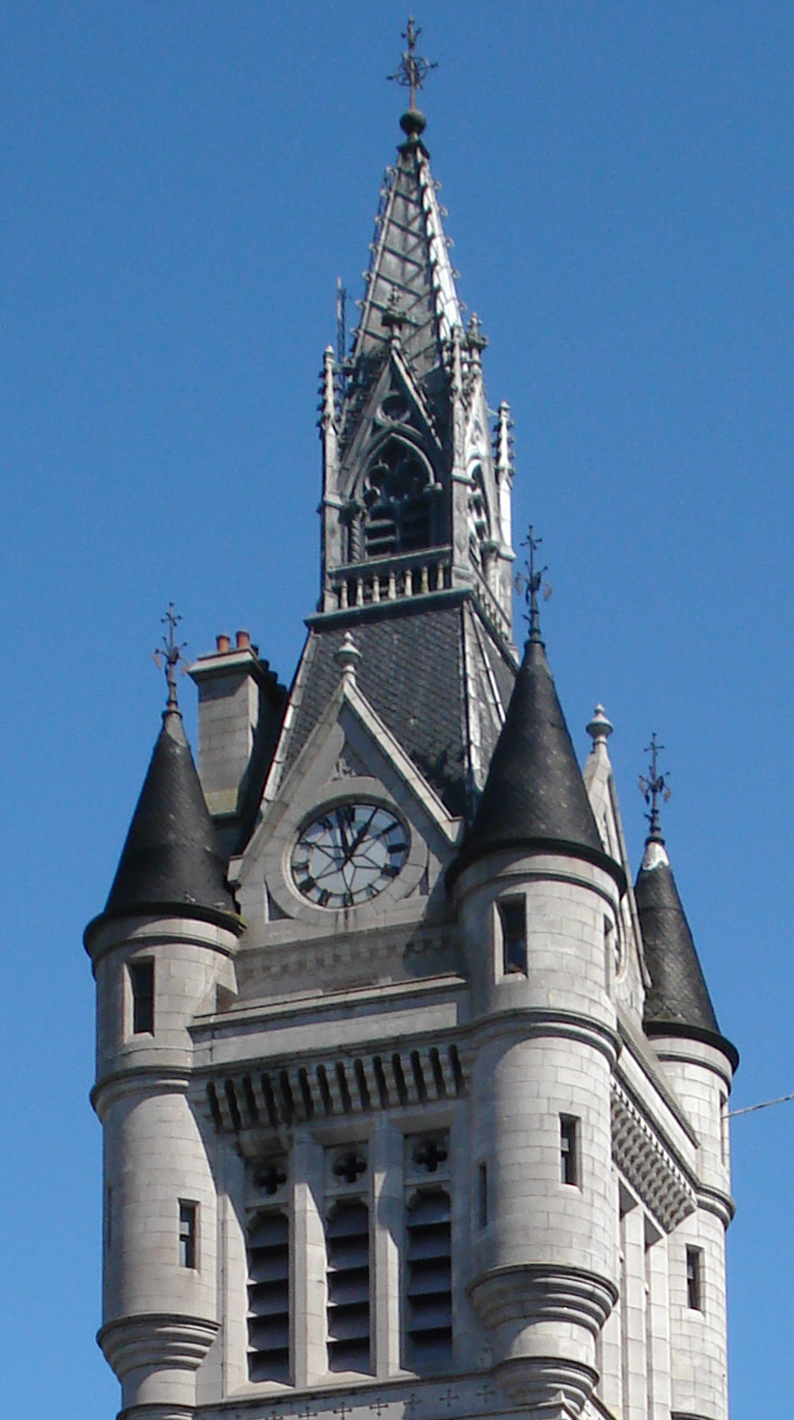
The West Tower of the new Town House

On the corner of Castle Street and King Street stands the old North of Scotland Bank by Aberdeen born architect, Archibald Simpson. This building, with its imposing corner entrance of four giant order composite columns, and statue of Ceres above, is now a pub named after its original architect. On the opposite side of the street is the fine building of the Union Bank, redeveloped in 2005 as the High Court, the third permanent high court to sit in Scotland.

== Castlegate ==
At the upper end of Castlegate stands The Salvation Army Citadel, an effective castellated mansion, on the site of the medieval Aberdeen Castle. In front of it is the Mercat Cross, built in 1686 by John Montgomery, a native architect. This open-arched structure, 21 ft (6 m) in diameter and 18 ft (5 m) high, comprises a large hexagonal base from the centre of which rises a shaft with a Corinthian capital, on which is the royal unicorn. The base is highly decorated, including medallions illustrating Scottish monarchs from James I to James VII. To the east of Castle Street were the military barracks, which were demolished in 1965 and replaced with two tower blocks.

Castlegate is also home to some of the oldest surviving streets in Aberdeen. Some of these are from the 13th and 14th centuries. Two houses, Provost Skene's House (1545) which is now a museum, and Provost Ross's House (1593) are in the Castlegate as well.

== Rosemount Viaduct ==
This imposing terrace of late Victorian granite buildings is a prominent landmark in the city. Constructed in 1892, to a design by open competition winner Alexander Brown, the Central Library, which was opened by its benefactor Andrew Carnegie, stands at the west end of the terrace. Brown was also responsible for the extension to create the Central Reading Room in 1905. St Mark's Church by architect Alexander Marshall Mackenzie in the middle of the terrace has a giant order quatrostyle Corinthian portico, and dome modelled on St Paul's in London. His Majesty's Theatre by Frank Matcham, 1906, stands at the east end.

== Marischal College ==
Marischal College and Greyfriars Kirk on Broad Street, opened by King Edward VII in 1906, is the second largest granite building in the world (after the Escorial, Madrid), and is one of the most splendid examples of Edwardian architecture in Britain. The architect, Alexander Marshall Mackenzie, a native of Elgin, adapted his material, white granite, to the design of the building with the originality of genius. This magnificent building is no longer a seat of learning. Following a comprehensive restoration project, it re-opened in 2011 as the new corporate headquarters of Aberdeen City Council.

== Religious Buildings ==
=== Kirk of St Nicholas ===
Kirk of St Nicholas, one of Scotland's largest parish churches and is subdivided into East and West churches. The large kirkyard of the Kirk of St Nicholas is separated from Union Street by a 147 ft (45 m) long Ionic façade. The divided church within, with a central tower and spire, forms one continuous building 220 ft (67 m) in length. The West Church was built in 1755, by James Gibbs, and the East Church was built in 1837 by Archibald Simpson.

=== St Machar's Cathedral ===
St Machar's Cathedral begun in the 12th century, a few hundred yards from the river Don took centuries to build with the exception of the period of the episcopate of William Elphinstone (1484–1511). Gavin Dunbar, who followed him in 1518, completed the structure by adding the two western spires and the southern transept. With high vaulted ceilings and a large church yard, you can see the remains of old parts of the church which are now ruin. Large columns supporting the ceiling arches tower from floor to ceiling on the north and south sides of the main section of the church.

== Residential buildings ==
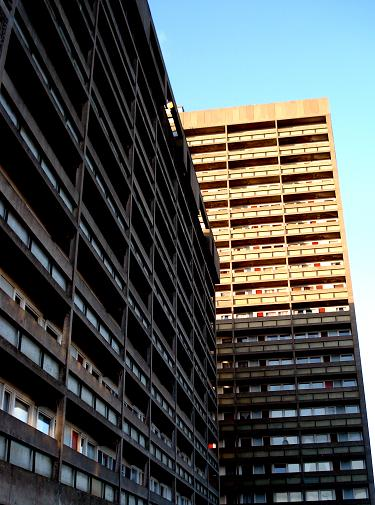
Seamount Court and Porthill Court (foreground)

Many high-rise residential buildings were built in Aberdeen following the Second World War. Of note are eight tower blocks constructed between 1959 and 1977 which were Grade A listed in January 2021, on account of their "outstanding architectural quality and historic interest". The decision to list the towers was controversial and was appealed by Aberdeen City Council to the Planning and Environmental Appeals Division (DPEA) of the Scottish Government. (Note: Kevin Stewart, Member of the Scottish Parliament (MSP) for Aberdeen Central described the decision as "ludicrous" and Douglas Lumsden, Member of the Scottish Parliament (MSP) for the North East Scotland and a former Aberdeen City councillor called it "the craziest decision people in this city will have ever heard".) In their decision, DPEA supported the listing of 5 of the 8 towers, Porthill Court, Seamount Court, Virginia Court, Marischal Court and Gilcomstoun Land. The DPEA required that 3 of the towers, Hutcheon, Greig and Thistle Courts, and some of the interiors of the remaining 5, be delisted.

== Other Significant Buildings in Aberdeen ==
The Masonic Temple in Crown Street, with its distinctive open pediment, designed by Harbourne Maclennan, Jenkins and Marr, and constructed in 1910, is an example of Edwardian Baroque architecture.

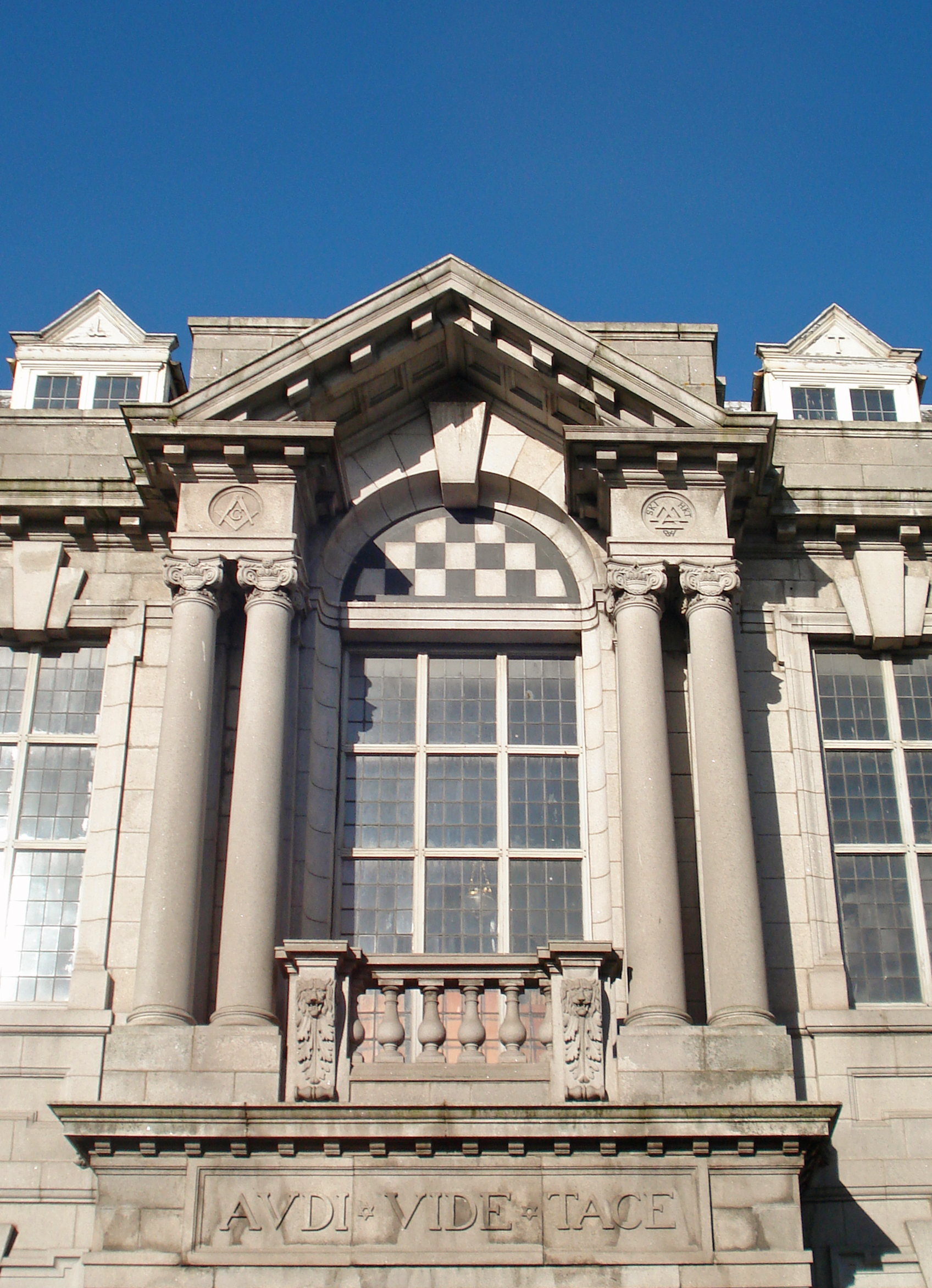
Open pediment, Masonic Temple, Crown Street, 1910.

== Bridges ==
=== Bridge of Dee ===
The Bridge of Dee was until 1832, the only access to the city from the south across the river Dee. It consists of seven semicircular ribbed arches, is about 30 ft (10 m) high, and was built in 1527 by Bishops Elphinstone and Dunbar. It was nearly all rebuilt 1718–23, and in 1842 was widened from 14 to 26 ft (4 to 8 m). This was the site of a battle in 1639 between the Royalists under Viscount Aboyne and the Covenanters who were led by the Marquis of Montrose.

=== St. Devenick's Bridge ===
St. Devenick's Bridge (locally known as the Shakkin' Briggie, or as Morison's Bridge), is a suspension bridge crossing the River Dee from Ardoe to Cults, designed by John Smith (architect), and built in 1837. It is now derelict. The bridge is a Category A listed structure and there are plans to restore it.

=== Wellington Bridge ===
Wellington Suspension Bridge is a very narrow river Dee crossing. It was designed by Captain Samuel Brown and opened in 1831 to replace the Craiglug ferry. Refurbished in 1930, the Category A listed building was closed to vehicular traffic in 1984 and to pedestrians in March 2002. Aberdeen City Council engineers strengthened and preserved the bridge and it reopened as a public footbridge in the late 2000s.

=== Bridge of Don ===
The Bridge of Don crosses river Don and has five granite arches, each 75 ft (23 m) in span, and was built 1827–1832.

=== Brig o' Balgownie ===
The Brig o' Balgownie is a picturesque single arch spanning the deep black stream, said to have been built by King Robert I, in 1320, and celebrated by George Gordon Byron, 6th Baron Byron in the tenth canto of "Don Juan".

== Statues ==
=== William Wallace ===
William Wallace's colossal bronze statue of 1888, by William Grant Stevenson RSA, looking south over Union Terrace Gardens and opposite His Majesty's Theatre.

=== Robert Burns ===
Robert Burns's bronze statue, 1892, by Henry Bain Smith, on Union Terrace.

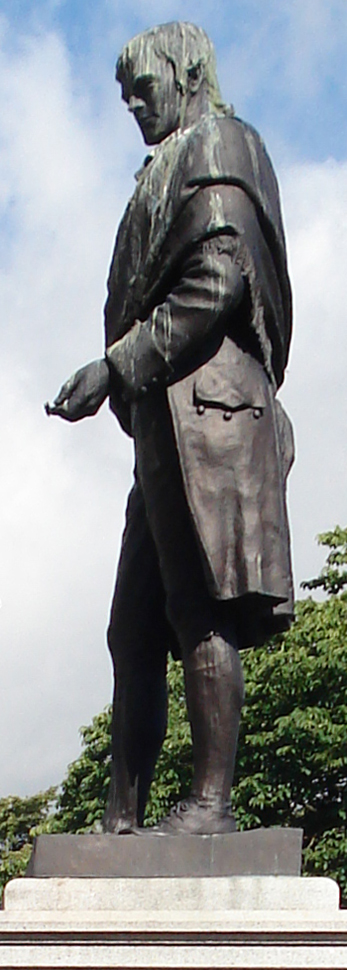
On Union Terrace, Robert Burns, 1892, bronze by Henry Bain Smith

=== Albert, Price Consort ===
Prince Albert seated, bronze statue opposite the Central Library. This statue is by Carlo Marochetti, famous for the equestrian figure of Richard the Lionheart outside the Palace of Westminster in London.

=== Sir James McGrigor ===
Sir James McGrigor (1778–1851) is celebrated with a 70 ft (21 m) high obelisk of Peterhead granite, originally erected in the square of Marischal College, in memory of the military surgeon and director-general of the Army Medical Department, who was thrice elected Rector of the college. In the 1890s when the college was extended, the obelisk was moved to Duthie Park.

=== General Charles Gordon ===
A bronze statue of Major-General Charles George Gordon, by T. Stuart Burnett, stands outside Robert Gordon's College and University in Schoolhill. General Charles Gordon is unrelated to the college's Robert Gordon.

=== Queen Victoria ===
Queen Victoria's bronze statue stands on the roundabout at Queens Cross facing west towards Balmoral. It was originally erected by the royal tradesmen of the city at the south-east corner of St. Nicholas Street and Union Street in 1893, replacing an earlier (1866) marble sculpture by Alexander Brodie (removed to the Town House in 1888) but was moved to its present location in 1964.

=== George Gordon ===
George Gordon, 5th Duke of Gordon's granite statue, by Thomas Campbell, stands in Golden Square and was moved from the Castlegate in 1952.

=== Lord Byron ===
Lord Byron's bronze statue, by Pittendreigh MacGillivray stands in grounds of Aberdeen Grammar School in front of the original main entrance.

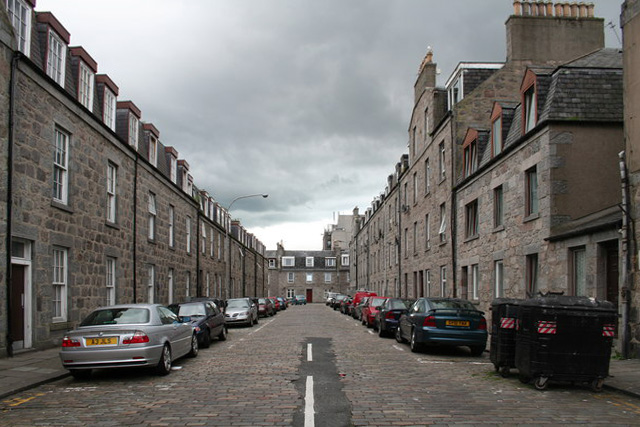
Granite terraced houses on Craigie Street
