= Alexander Bain (philosopher) =

Scottish philosopher and educationalist

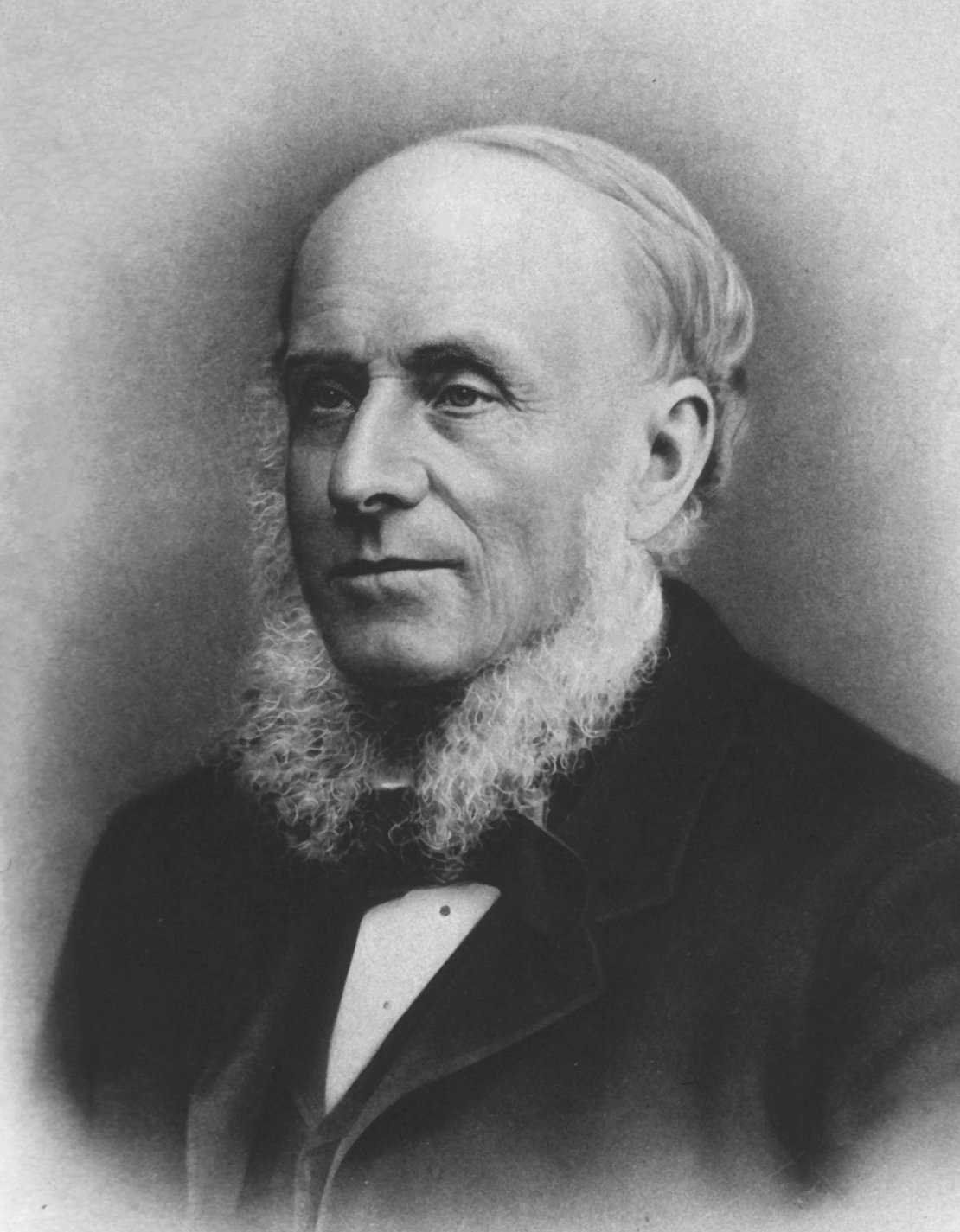
- Born: 11 June 1818; Aberdeen, Scotland
- Died: 18 September 1903 (aged 85); Aberdeen, Scotland
- Education: Marischal College (MA (Hons))
- Known for: The Senses and the Intellect; The Emotions and the Will; Mental and Moral Science; Education as a Science; Mind
- Scientific career
- Fields: Moral philosophy; Philosophy of mind; Psychology; Logic; Linguistics; Education
- Institutions: University of Aberdeen; University of London; University of Glasgow; Anderson's University; Marischal College

Alexander Bain (11 June 1818 – 18 September 1903) was a Scottish philosopher and educationalist in the British school of empiricism and a prominent and innovative figure in the fields of psychology, linguistics, logic, moral philosophy and education reform. He founded Mind, the first ever journal of psychology and analytical philosophy, and was the leading figure in establishing and applying the scientific method to psychology. Bain was the inaugural Regius Chair in Logic and Professor of Logic at the University of Aberdeen, where he also held Professorships in Moral Philosophy and English Literature and was twice elected Lord Rector of the University of Aberdeen.

== Early life and education ==
Alexander Bain was born in Aberdeen, north Scotland, to George Bain, a weaver and veteran soldier, and Margaret Paul. At age eleven he left school to work as a weaver hence the description of him as Weevir, rex philosophorum. He also attended lectures at the Mechanics' Institutes of Aberdeen and the Aberdeen Public Library.

In 1836 he entered Marischal College where he came under the influence of Professor of Mathematics John Cruickshank, Professor of Chemistry Thomas Clark and Professor of Natural Philosophy William Knight. Towards the end of his undergraduate degree he became a contributor to the Westminster Review with his first article entitled "Electrotype and Daguerreotype," published in September 1840. This was the beginning of his connection with John Stuart Mill, which led to a lifelong friendship. He was awarded the Blue Ribbon and also the Gray Mathematical Bursary. His college career and studies were distinguished especially in mental philosophy, mathematics and physics and he graduated with a Master of Arts with Highest Honours.

In 1841, Bain substituted for Dr. Glennie the Professor of Moral Philosophy, who, due to ill-health, was unable to discharge his academic duties. He continued to do this three successive terms, during which he continued writing for the Westminster, and also helped John Stuart Mill with the revision of the manuscript of his System of Logic (1842). In 1843 he contributed the first review of the book to the London and Westminster.

== Academic career ==
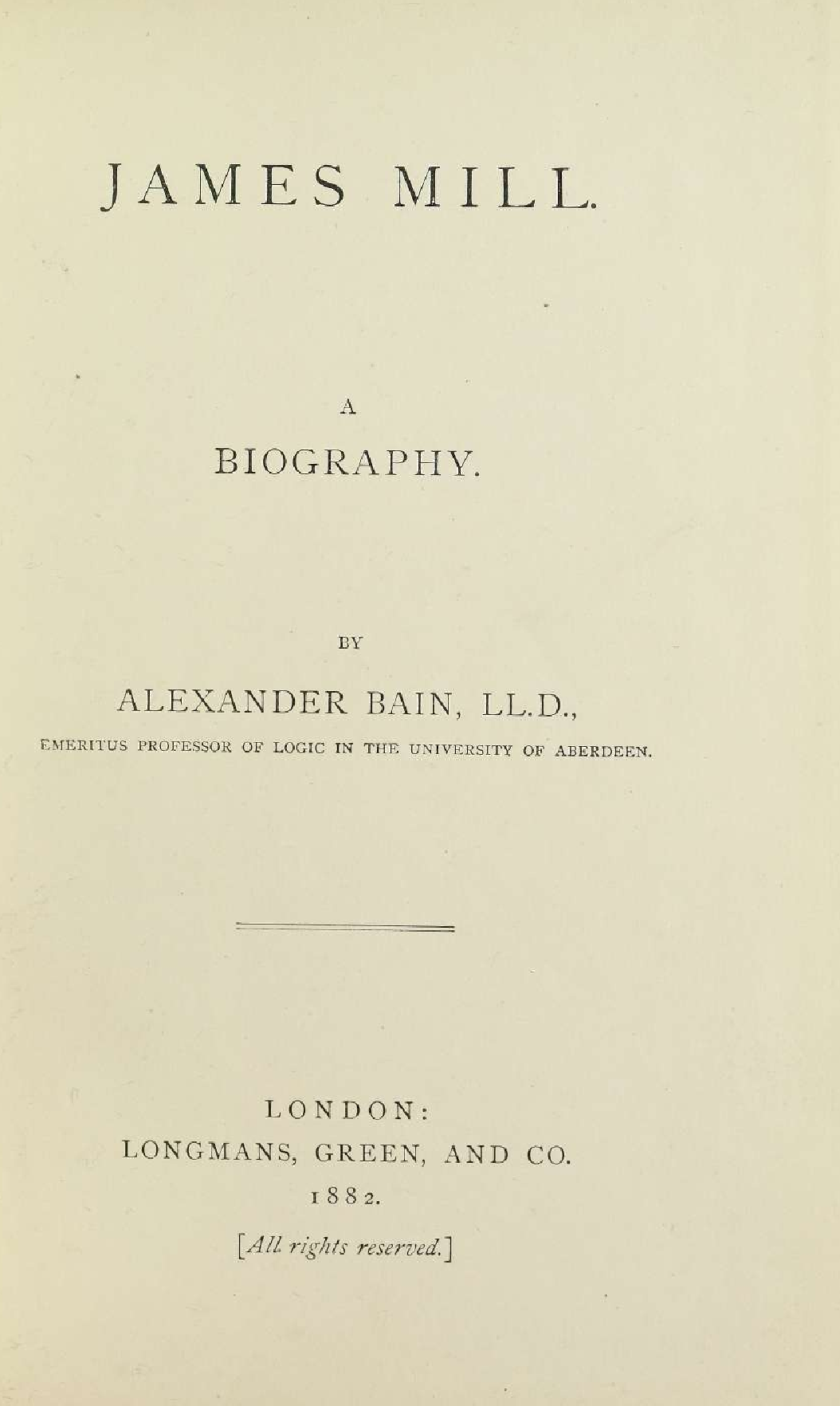
Cover page of Bain's biography of James Mill, 1882

In 1845 he was appointed Professor of Mathematics and Natural philosophy at Anderson's University in Glasgow. A year later, preferring a wider field, he resigned the position and devoted himself to writing. In 1848 he moved to London to fill a post in the Board of Health under Sir Edwin Chadwick where he worked for social reform and became a prominent member of the intellectual circle which included George Grote and John Stuart Mill. In 1855 he published his first major work, The Senses and the Intellect, followed in 1859 by The Emotions and the Will. These treatises won him a position among independent thinkers. Bain was also Examiner in Logic and Moral Philosophy from 1857 to 1862 and 1864–1869 for the University of London and also an instructor in moral science for the Indian Civil Service examinations.

In 1860 he was appointed by the British Crown to the inaugural Regius Chair of Logic and the Regius Chair of English Literature at the University of Aberdeen, which was newly formed after the amalgamation of King's College, Aberdeen and Marischal College by the Scottish Universities Commission of 1858.

=== Linguistics ===
Until 1858, neither logic nor English had received adequate attention in Aberdeen, and Bain devoted himself to supplying these deficiencies. He succeeded not only in raising the Standard of Education generally in the North of Scotland, but also in establishing a School of Philosophy at the University of Aberdeen, and in widely influencing the teaching of English grammar and composition in the United Kingdom. His efforts were first directed to the preparation of textbooks: An English Grammar was published in 1863 (later revised as Higher English Grammar), followed in 1866 by the Manual of Rhetoric, in 1872 by A First English Grammar, and in 1874 by the Companion to the Higher Grammar. These works were wide-ranging and their original views and methods met with wide acceptance.

=== Philosophy ===
Bain's philosophical writings already published, especially The Senses and the Intellect to which was added in 1861 The On the Study of Character including an Estimate of Phrenology, were too large for effective use in the classroom. Accordingly, in 1868, he published his Manual of Mental and Moral Science, mainly a condensed form of his treatises, with the doctrines re-stated, and in many instances freshly illustrated, and with many important additions. The year 1870 saw the publication of the Logic. This, too, was a work designed for the use of students; it was based on John Stuart Mill, but differed from him in many particulars, and was distinctive for its treatment of the doctrine of the conservation of energy in connection with causation and the detailed application of the principles of logic to the various sciences with a section on the classification of all the sciences. Next came two publications in the "International Scientific Series", namely, Mind and Body (1872), and Education as a Science (1879). All these works, from the Higher English Grammar downwards, were written by Bain during his twenty years as a professor at the University of Aberdeen. He also started the philosophical journal, Mind; the first number appeared in January 1876, under the editorship of a former pupil, George Croom Robertson, of University College London. To this journal Bain contributed many important articles and discussions; and in fact he bore the whole expenses of it till Robertson, owing to ill-health, resigned the editorship in 1891 and George Stout took up the baton.

=== Psychology ===
Although his influence as a logician and linguist in grammar and rhetoric was considerable, his reputation rests on his works in psychology. At one with the German physiologist and comparative anatomist Johannes Peter Müller in the conviction psychologus nemo nisi physiologus (one is not a psychologist who is not also a physiologist), he was the first in Great Britain during the 19th century to apply physiology in a thoroughgoing fashion to the elucidation of mental states. In discussing the will, he favoured physiological over metaphysical explanations, pointing to reflexes as evidence that a form of will, independent of consciousness, inheres in a person's limbs. He sought to chart physiological correlates of mental states but refused to make any materialistic assumptions. His idea of applying the scientific method of classification to psychical phenomena gave scientific character to his work, the value of which was enhanced by his methodical exposition and his command of illustration. In line with this, too, is his demand that psychology should be cleared of metaphysics; and to his lead is no doubt due in great measure the position that psychology has now acquired as a distinct positive science. Bain established psychology, as influenced by David Hume and Auguste Comte, as a more distinct discipline of science through application of the scientific method. Bain proposed that physiological and psychological processes were linked, and that traditional psychology could be explained in terms of this association. Moreover, he proposed that all knowledge and all mental processes had to be based on actual physical sensations, and not on spontaneous thoughts and ideas, and attempted to identify the link between the mind and the body and to discover the correlations between mental and behavioural phenomena.

William James calls his work the "last word" of the earlier stage of psychology, but he was in reality the pioneer of the new. Subsequent psycho-physical investigations "have all been in" the spirit of his work; and although he consistently advocated the introspective method in psychological investigation, he was among the first to appreciate the help that may be given to it by social psychology, comparative psychology and developmental psychology. He may justly claim the merit of having guided the awakened psychological interest of British thinkers of the second half of the 19th century into fruitful channels. Bain emphasised the importance of our active experiences of movement and effort, and though his theory of a central innervation sense is no longer held as he propounded it, its value as a suggestion to later psychologists is great. His thought that a belief is but a preparation for action is respected by both pragmatism and functionalism.

=== Other works ===
Bain's autobiography, published in 1904, contains a full list of his works, and also the history of the last thirteen years of his life by Professor W. L. Davidson of the University of Aberdeen, who further contributed to Mind (April 1904) a review of Bain's services to philosophy. Further works include editions with notes of Paley's Moral Philosophy (1852); Education as a Science (1879); Dissertations on leading philosophical topics (1903, mainly reprints of papers in Mind); he collaborated with JS Mill and Grote in editing James Mill's Analysis of the Phenomena of the Human Mind (1869), and assisted in editing Grote's Aristotle and Minor Works; he also wrote a memoir prefixed to G Croom Robertson's Philosophical Remains (1894).

== Social reform ==
Bain took a keen interest in social justice and development and was frequently an active part in the political and social movements of the day; after his retirement from the Chair of Logic, he was twice elected Lord Rector of the University of Aberdeen each term of office extending over three years. He was a strenuous advocate of reform, especially in the teaching of sciences, and supported the claims of modern languages to a place in the curriculum. Moreover, he was an avid supporter for student rights and in 1884 the Aberdeen University Debating Society took the first steps towards the introduction of a students' representative council and later Aberdeen University Students' Association under his support.

Bain was a member of the Committee of the Aberdeen Public Library throughout his life as well as the School Board of Aberdeen. Furthermore, Professor Bain gave lectures and wrote papers for the Mechanics' Institutes of Aberdeen and served as the Secretary of its committee.

His services to education and social reform in Scotland were recognised by the conferment of the honorary degree of Doctor of law by the University of Edinburgh in 1871. A marble bust of him stands in the Aberdeen Public Library and his portrait hangs in Marischal College.

== Later life and death ==
Bain retired from his chair and Professorship from the University of Aberdeen and was succeeded by William Minto, one of his most brilliant pupils. Nevertheless, his interest in thought, and his desire to complete the scheme of work mapped out in earlier years, remained as keen as ever. Accordingly, in 1882 appeared the Biography of James Mill, and accompanying it John Stuart Mill: a Criticism, with Personal Recollections. Next came (1884) a collection of articles and papers, most of which had appeared in magazines, under the title of Practical Essays. This was succeeded (1887, 1888) by a new edition of the Rhetoric, and along with it, a book On Teaching English, being an exhaustive application of the principles of rhetoric to the criticism of style, for the use of teachers; and in 1894 he published a revised edition of The Senses and the Intellect, which contain his last word on psychology. In 1894 also appeared his last contribution to Mind. His last years were spent in privacy at Aberdeen, where he died on 18 September 1903. He married twice but left no children. His last request was that "no stone should be placed upon his grave: his books, he said, would be his monument."

The University of Aberdeen Philosophy Department established the Bain Medal in 1883. It is awarded annually to the best candidate who gains First Class Honours in Mental philosophy.

As Professor William L. Davidson wrote in Bain's obituary in Mind "In Dr. Bain's death, psychology has sustained a great loss; but so too has education and practical reform. It is rare to find a philosopher who combines philosophical with educational and practical interests, and who is also an active force in the community in which he dwells. Such a combination was here. Let us not fail to appreciate it."

== Bibliography ==
- "Early Life of James Mill", from Mind, Vol. 1, No. 1 (January 1876).
- Review of Herbert Spencer's Principles of Sociology, from Mind, Vol. 1, No. 1 (January 1876).
- "Mr. G. H. Lewes and the Postulates of Experience", from Mind, Vol. 1, No. 1 (January 1876).
- Education as a Science, New York: D. Appleton and Company, 1884.
- Practical Essays
- Dissertations on Leading Philosophical Topics
- Autobiography by Alexander Bain LL.D. London: Longmans, Green & Co. 1904.
- Elements of Chemistry and Electricity
- Astronomy
- James Mill, A Biography (1 ed.), London: Longmans, Green & Co., 1882.
- John Stuart Mill: A Criticism with Personal Recollections, London: Longmans, Green & Co., 1882.
- The Art of Study
- Is There Such a Thing As Pure Malevolence?
- The Classical Controversy
- The University Ideal: Past and Present
- On Teaching English: With Detailed Examples and an Enquiry Into the Definition of Poetry
- English Composition and Rhetoric: Emotional Qualities of Style
- English Composition and Rhetoric: Intellectual Elements of Style
- English Grammar as Bearing Upon Composition
- First English Grammar
- A Higher English Grammar
- An English Grammar
- English Composition and Rhetoric: A Manual
- Logic: Induction
- Logic: Volume 1
- Deduction
- Some Points in Ethics
- Fragments on Ethical Subjects
- The Moral Philosophy of Paley
- The Emotions and the Will, 1859
- The Senses and the Intellect, 1855
- Mind And Body: The Theories of Their Relation
- Physiological Expression in Psychology
- Analysis of the Phenomena of the Human Mind: Volume 1
- How to Study Character; Or, the True Basis for the Science of Mind
- Pleasure and Pain
- On the Study of Character: Including an Estimate of Phrenology
- Mental Science: A Compendium of Psychology, and the History of Philosophy, Designed as a Text-Book for High-Schools and Colleges
- Moral Science: A Compendium of Ethics
- Mental and Moral Science: A Compendium of Psychology and Ethics, London: Longmans, Green & Co., 1868.
- Mental and Moral Science: Psychology and History of Philosophy
- Mental and Moral Science: Theory of Ethics and Ethical Systems

== See also ==
- Association of ideas
- Grupo Alexander Bain
- Psychophysical parallelism
- Mind
- Stream of consciousness (narrative mode)

Academic offices
Preceded by Earl of Rosebery	Lord Rector of the University of Aberdeen; 1881–?	Succeeded by Marquess of Huntly
Preceded by none	Regius Chair in Logic at the University of Aberdeen ?–?	Succeeded by William Minto
