= Alexander Souter =

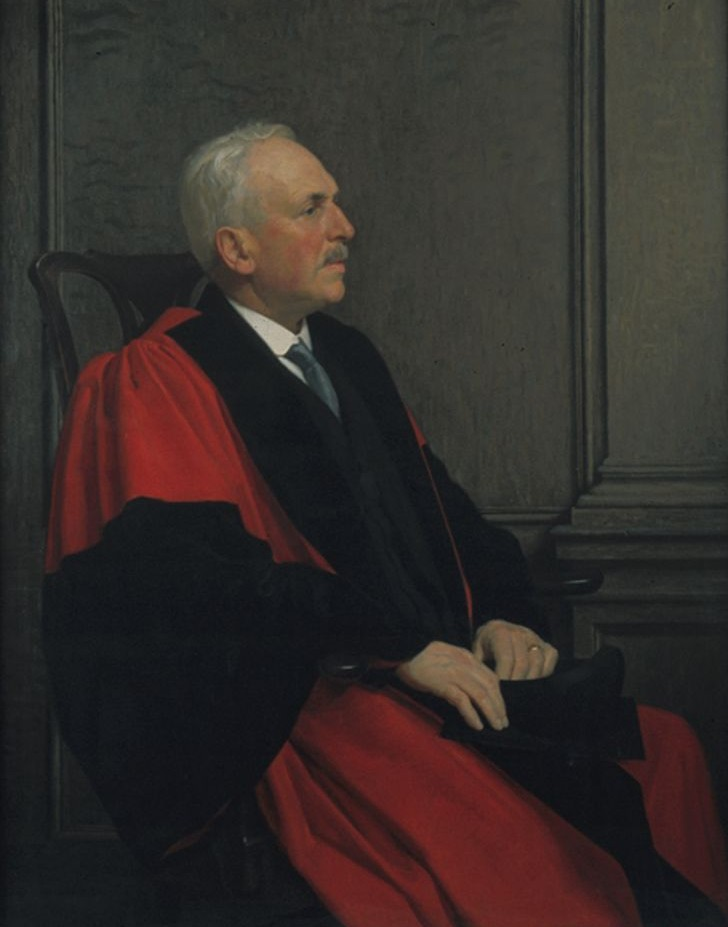
- Portrait by John Bulloch Souter

Professor of New Testament Greek and Exegesis at Mansfield College
- In office 1903–1911

Regius Professor of Humanity the University of Aberdeen
- In office 1911 – 1937 (retired)
- Preceded by: William Mitchell Ramsay

Personal details
- Born: 14 August 1873 Perth, Scotland
- Died: 17 January 1949 (aged 75)
- Education: University of Aberdeen, University of Cambridge

Alexander Souter FBA (14 August 1873 – 17 January 1949) was a Scottish biblical scholar and university professor.

== Biography ==
Souter was born in Perth, and studied at the University of Aberdeen and the University of Cambridge. He subsequently became a Latin assistant at Aberdeen. While at Cambridge he studied under J. E. B. Mayor, whom Souter would credit with influence on his later scholarship.

In 1903 he was appointed professor of New Testament Greek and Exegesis at Mansfield College, Oxford. In 1911 he moved back to the University of Aberdeen, succeeding William Ramsay as Regius Professor of Humanity, in which position he remained until his retirement in 1937.

Upon his retirement, Souter moved back to Oxford, where he became editor-in-chief of the proposed Oxford Latin Dictionary. The outbreak of World War II prevented its completion within his lifetime, but Souter did publish a smaller work borne of this endeavour, Glossary of Later Latin, A.D. 150–600.

Souter married Elizabeth Barr Anderson, daughter of Aberdeen Photographer William Blair Anderson. They had three daughters, Isabella Elsie Souter (who married Alfred Thomson Barclay Dickson) born in 1900, Elizabeth Barr Anderson Souter (who died suddenly at the age of 16) born in 1903 and Alexandra Margaret Souter (known as Peggy, who married Peter Jackson) born in 1908. His brother-in-law was William Blair Anderson, who was Kennedy Professor of Latin at Cambridge University and a leading Latin scholar of his day. A portrait of Souter by his brother John Bulloch Souter is held by Aberdeen University.

== Scholarship ==
Souter's two main interests were in the text of the New Testament and in early Latin commentaries on the Pauline epistles. He published an edition of the New Testament in 1910 (revised edition 1947) giving the Greek text on which the English Revised Version of 1881 was based, along with commentary on variants. His work on the Pauline epistles included proposed revisions to many accepted attributions, notably of Ambrosiaster, as well as numerous commentaries on and editions of other works. A public lecture is held annually in the University of Aberdeen in memory of this scholar.

== Works ==
- The Text and the Canon of the New Testament. Duckworth. 1913.
- A Pocket Lexicon to the Greek New Testament. Oxford: Clarendon Press. 1916.
- Tertullian's Treatises Concerning Prayer, Concerning Baptism, London: SPCK, 1919.
- Hints on Translation from Latin into English, London: SPCK, 1920
- Hints on the Study of Latin (A.D. 125–750), London: SPCK, 1920
- Tertullian against Praxeas, London: SPCK, 1920
- Tertullian Concerning the Resurrection of the Flesh, London: SPCK, 1922
- The Earliest Latin Commentaries on the Epistles of St. Paul. Oxford: Clarendon Press. 1927.
- A Glossary of Later Latin to 600 A.D., London: Oxford University Press, 1949
