= Margaret McGhie (innkeeper) =

- Years active: fl.1760-1770s
- Spouse: John McGhee

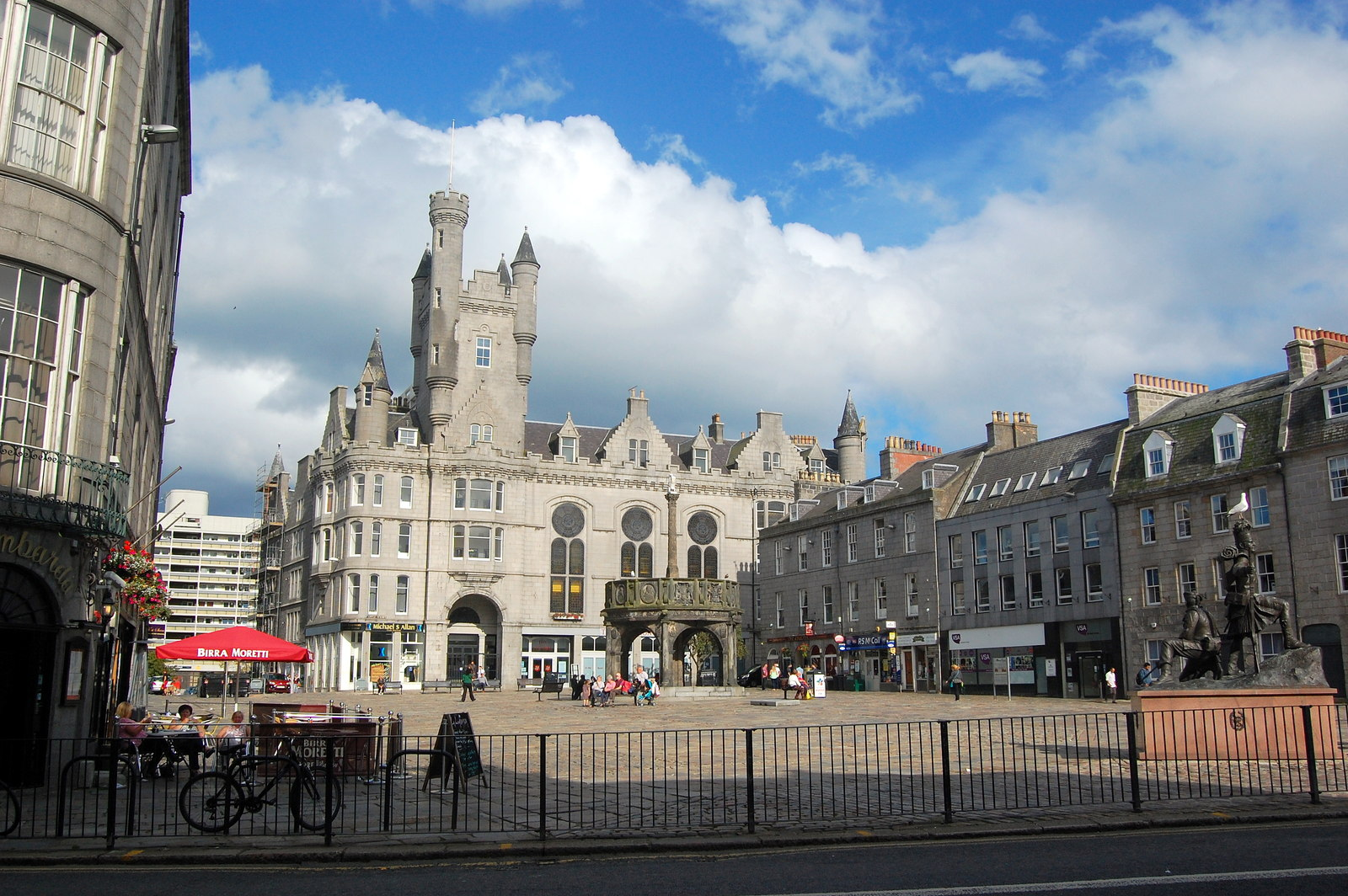
Contemporary image of The Castlegate, Aberdeen

Margaret McGhie (fl. 1760-1770s.) was an Aberdeen innkeeper operating "The New Inn" from 1763 to 1776.

== Career ==
Margaret McGhie ran a well-established inn located in the Castlegate alongside her husband, John McGhie. After his death in 1770, she took over the business and became associated with it. The Aberdeen's Journal repeatedly described The New Inn as ‘Mrs. McGhie’s House’.

As a middle-class business owner, she aimed to appeal to the clientele from nobility and gentry by providing appropriate entertainment in addition to maintaining a high standard of accommodations and service. Some accounts suggest that during her sole proprietorship, the inn grew in popularity and status.

Without a citizenship status, McGhie, like other women business owners, established social power through their role in the commercial community.
