= Geography of Aberdeen =

Aberdeen City council area in Scotland

Aberdeen, Scotland is a city located between the River Dee and the River Don.

== Climate ==
Exposed Aberdeen is noted for its biting winds and driving rain, which sweep in from the North Sea, the mean temperature is 8 °C (46 °F) and it varies between an average low of 5 and 11 °C (41 and 52 °F). In summer (June - August) the average high is 16 °C (61 °F) and average low 9 °C (48 °F). In winter (December - February) the average high is 6 °C (43 °F) and average low 0 °C (32 °F).

The average yearly precipitation is 753 millimetres (29.6 in), with 64 millimetres (2.5 in) in summer (June - August) and 62 millimetres (2.4 in) in winter (December - February). The wettest months are October and November.

== Demographics ==
Educationally, Aberdeen has a higher student rate than the national average of 11.5% compared with 7% nationally.

There were 97,013 individual dwellings recorded in the city of which 61% were privately owned, 9% privately rented and 23% rented from the council. The most popular type of dwellings are apartments which have 49% of residences followed by semi-detached at just below 22%.

The average income of a household in the city is £16,813 (2005) which places about 18% households in the city below the poverty line (defined as 60% of the mean income).

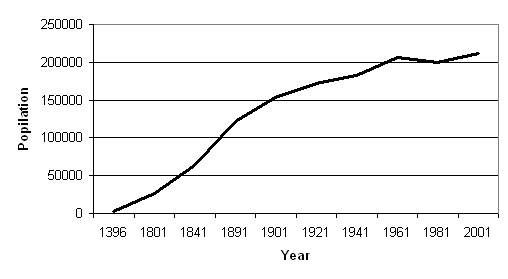
Aberdeen demographics (source data: Visit of Britain)

In 1396 the population was about 3,000. By 1801 it had become 26,992; in 1841 it was 63,262; (1891) 121,623; (1901) 153,503; (1941) 182,467. In 2001 it UK census records the Aberdeen City Council areas population at 212,125, but the Aberdeen locality's population at 184,788. The latest official population estimate, published by the General Register for Scotland for 2005, is 202,370.

The population density of Aberdeen is 2,819 persons per square mile (1,088 persons/km^{2}).

Data from the Aberdeen specific locality of the 2001 UK census shows that the demographics include a median male age of 35 and female age of 38 which are younger than Scotland's average and a 49% to 51% male to female ratio.

It also showed that there are fewer young people in Aberdeen, with 16.4% under 16, opposed to the national average of 19.2%. Ethnically, 15.7% were born outside Scotland, higher than the national average of 12.9%. Of this population 8.4% were born in England. 3% of Aberdonians are considered to be from an ethnic minority (non-white), with 0.7% from the Indian-subcontinent and 0.6% Asian.

Religiously, the last census revealed that Aberdeen is the least religious city in Scotland, with nearly 43% of people claiming to have no religion.

== Topography ==
Aberdeen extends to 71.22 square miles (184.5 km^{2}), and includes the former burghs of Old Aberdeen, New Aberdeen, Woodside and the Royal Burgh of Torry to the south of River Dee. The city is built on many hills, with the original beginnings of the city growing from Castle Hill, St. Catherine's Hill and Windmill Hill (also known as the Gallowgate).

== Reference tables ==
=== Temperature ===
Average (unless stated) / Month	Average	Jan	Feb	Mar	Apr	May	Jun	Jul	Aug	Sep	Oct	Nov	Dec
High temperature Celsius (°F)	11 (52)	5 (42)	6 (43)	7 (46)	10 (50)	12 (55)	15 (60)	17 (64)	17 (64)	15 (59)	11 (53)	8 (47)	6 (44)
Low temperature Celsius (°F)	5 (41)	0 (32)	0 (33)	1 (35)	2 (37)	5 (42)	8 (47)	10 (51)	10 (50)	7 (46)	5 (42)	2 (37)	1 (35)
Highest recorded temp. Celsius (°F)	Highest ever: 27 (82)	17 (63)	17 (63)	20 (68)	23 (74)	24 (76)	26 (79)	27 (82)	27 (82)	24 (76)	21 (70)	16 (62)	15 (60)
Lowest recorded temp. Celsius (°F)	Lowest ever: -18 (-2)	-18 (-2)	-15 (5)	-11 (12)	-3 (25)	-3 (26)	-0 (33)	2 (37)	0 (32)	-2 (28)	-3 (25)	-15 (5)	-13 (7)
Dew points Celsius (°F)	year: 5 (41)	0.5 (33)	0.5 (33)	1.6 (35)	2.8 (37)	5.6 (42)	8.3 (47)	10.6 (51)	10.6 (51)	8.3 (47)	6.1 (43)	2.8 (37)	1.6 (35)
Source: Washington Post Weather, Weatherbase (dew points)

=== Precipitation ===
Average / Month	Average	Jan	Feb	Mar	Apr	May	Jun	Jul	Aug	Sep	Oct	Nov	Dec
Precipitation millimetres (in)	62 (2.5) / year: 753 (29.7)	63 (2.5)	50 (2.0)	53 (2.1)	48 (1.9)	53 (2.1)	50 (2.0)	71 (2.8)	71 (2.8)	63 (2.5)	76 (3.0)	78 (3.1)	73 (2.9)
Number of rain days	23.75 / year: 285	22	20	23	25	19	23	24	22	23	24	24	26
Highest rec. rainfall millimetres (in)	ever: 269 (10.6)	157 (6.2)	129 (5.1)	132 (5.2	155 (6.1)	153 (6)	122 (4.8)	198 (7.8)	178 (7)	193 (7.6)	198 (7.8)	269 (10.6)	244 (9.4)
Lowest rec. rainfall millimetres (in)	ever:	5 (0.2)	5 (0.2)	5 (0.2)	2.5 (0.1)	5 (0.2)	12 (0.5)	12 (0.5)	0 (0)	15 (0.6)	7.6 (0.3)	10 (0.4)	12 (0.5)
Sources: Washington Post Weather (precipitation), Interhome (rain days), Weatherbase (highest and lowest precipitation)

=== Other Data ===
Average (unless stated) / Month	Average	Jan	Feb	Mar	Apr	May	Jun	Jul	Aug	Sep	Oct	Nov	Dec
Sunshine hours	114.4 / year: 1372.5	53	74.6	113.2	147.6	175.8	174.3	158.7	154.1	117.3	95.8	63.3	45
Humidity morning / afternoon (%)	87 / 75 / day: 85	85 / 81	86 / 77	86 / 72	87 / 70	88 / 71	87 / 72	88 / 72	90 / 72	88 / 73	88 / 78	86 / 80	85 / 82
Wind miles per hour (km/h)	12 (20)	14 (24)	12 (20)	13 (22)	11 (18)	11 (18)	11 (18)	10 (16)	10 (16)	11 (18)	12 (20)	13 (22)	12 (20)
Sealevel pressure millibars	1011.4	1009.2	1011.1	1010.9	1012.6	1014.6	1014.7	1012.8	1011.9	1012.2	1010.3	1009.3	1007.7
Station level pressure millibars	1004.4	1000.2	1005.6	1002.0	1007.6	1006.4	1007.4	1006.8	1006.6	1004.5	1003.1	1002.0	1000.6
Days with fog	year: 113	7	7	8	9	13	12	12	13	9	10	6	7
Days with thunderstorms	year: 3	0	0	0	0	0	1	1	1	0	0	0	0
Sources: Washington Post Weather (humidity and wind), Met Office (sunshine hours), World Climate (sea and station level pressures), Weatherbase (thunderstorms and fog)

=== Population Data ===
Year	1396	1801	1841	1891	1901	1921	1941	1961	1981	2001	2005 (est)
Population	3,000	26,992	63,262	121,623	153,503	171,709	182,467	205,969	199,770	212,125	202,370
Source: Vision of Britain

Age range of population (years)	0-4	5-15	16-29	30-44	45-59	60-74	75 and over
Percentage (Aberdeen / Scotland average)	4.6 (5.47)	11.16 (13.73)	23.66 (17.46)	22.48 (22.97)	17.61 (19.29)	13.20 (13.98)	7.28 (7.09)
Source: Scotland's Census 2001

== See also ==
- Demographics of Scotland
- General Register Office for Scotland; collects data and statistics, including Scotland's Census data
- United Kingdom Census 2001; this page has links to other regions census data in the UK
- Met Office; the government owned UK weather service with detailed climate information
