= Jane Stevenson =

Jane Stevenson may refer to:

- Jane Stevenson (historian) (born 1959), British historian, literary scholar, and author
- Jane Stevenson (politician) (born 1971), British politician, MP for Wolverhampton North East
