= English Men of Letters =

British biography series

English Men of Letters was a series of literary biographies written by leading literary figures of the day and published by Macmillan, under the general editorship of John Morley. The original series was launched in 1878, with Leslie Stephen's biography of Samuel Johnson, and ran until 1892. A second series, again under the general editorship of Morley, was published between 1902 and 1919.

== First series ==
1. Leslie Stephen, Samuel Johnson, 1878
2. James Cotter Morison, Gibbon, 1878
3. Richard H. Hutton, Sir Walter Scott, 1878
4. John Addington Symonds, Shelley, 1878
5. Thomas Henry Huxley, Hume, 1879
6. William Black, Goldsmith, 1878
7. William Minto, Daniel Defoe, 1879
8. John Campbell Shairp, Robert Burns, 1879
9. R. W. Church, Spenser, 1879
10. Anthony Trollope, Thackeray, 1879
11. John Morley, Burke, 1879
12. Mark Pattison, Milton, 1879
13. Henry James, Nathaniel Hawthorne, 1879
14. Edward Dowden, Southey, 1879
15. Adolphus William Ward, Chaucer, 1879
16. Goldwin Smith, Cowper, 1880
17. James Anthony Froude, Bunyan, 1879
18. John Nichol, Byron, 1880
19. Thomas Fowler, Locke, 1880
20. Leslie Stephen, Alexander Pope, 1880

21. Alfred Ainger, Charles Lamb, 1882
22. David Masson, Quincey, 1881
23. Sidney Colvin, Landor, 1881
24. George Saintsbury, Dryden, 1881
25. F. W. H. Myers, Wordsworth, 1881
26. Richard Claverhouse Jebb, Bentley, 1882
27. Leslie Stephen, Swift, 1882
28. Adolphus William Ward, Dickens, 1882
29. Edmund Gosse, Gray, 1882
30. H. D. Traill, Sterne, 1882
31. James Cotter Morison, Macaulay, 1882
32. Austin Dobson, Fielding, 1883
33. Mrs. Oliphant, Sheridan, 1883
34. W. J. Courthope, Addison, 1884
35. R. W. Church, Bacon, 1884
36. H. D. Traill, Coleridge, 1884
37. John Addington Symonds, Sir Philip Sidney, 1886
38. Sidney Colvin, Keats, 1887
39. John Nichol, Thomas Carlyle, 1892
