= Education in Aberdeen =

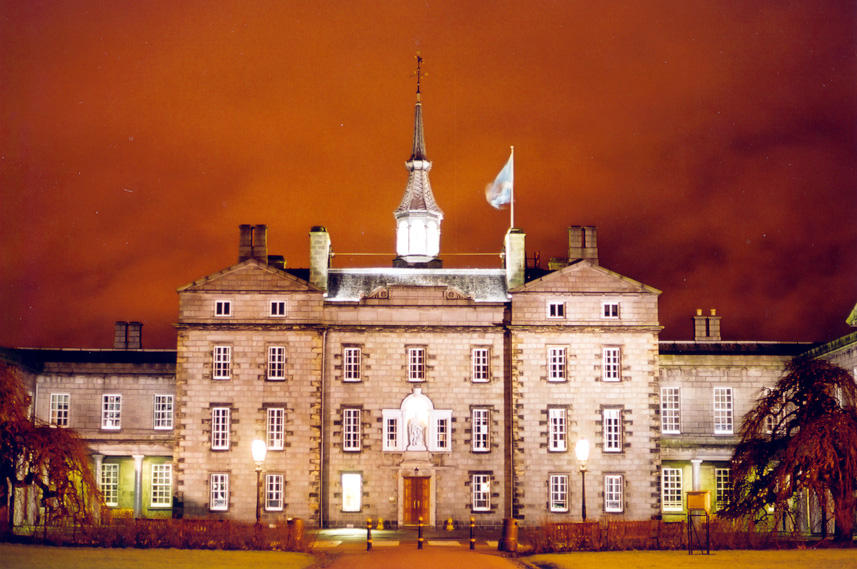
Robert Gordon's College

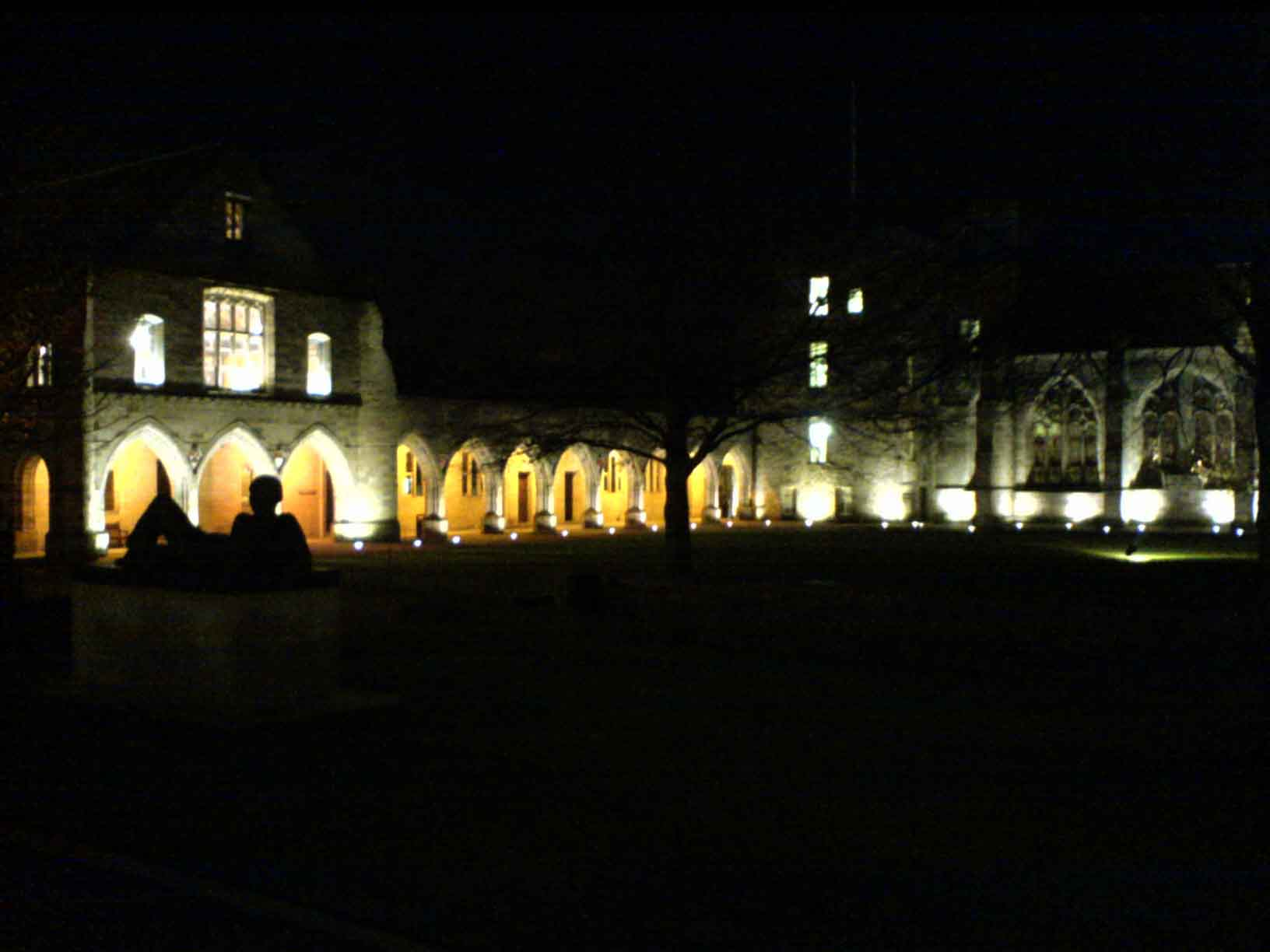
University of Aberdeen, Elphinstone Hall

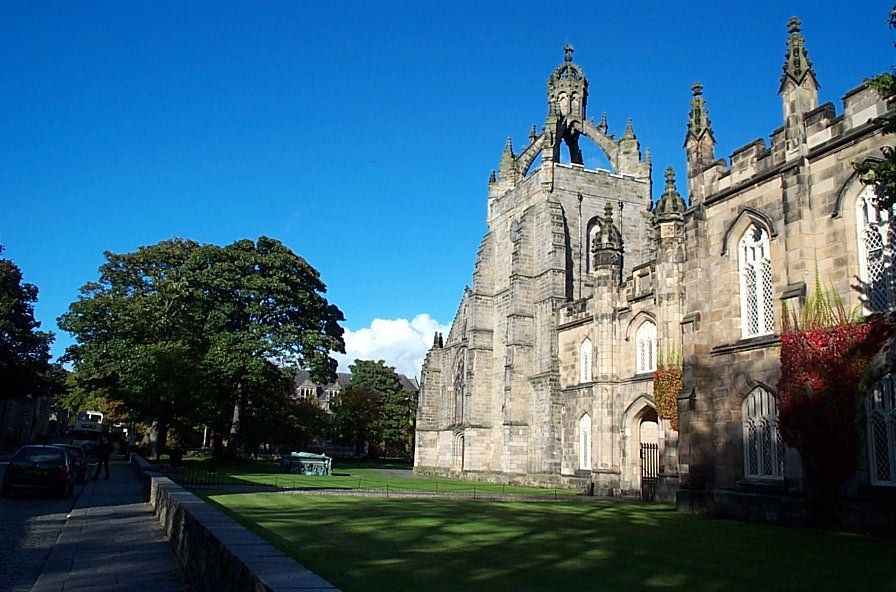
King's College, Old Aberdeen

Education in Aberdeen, Scotland has a strong tradition with two Universities and Scotland's largest further education college.

== Universities ==
The first of Aberdeen's two universities, King's College, was founded in 1495 by William Elphinstone (1431–1514), Bishop of Aberdeen and Chancellor of Scotland. Marischal College was founded in New Aberdeen by George Keith, 5th Earl Marischal of Scotland in 1593. These foundations were amalgamated to form the present University of Aberdeen in 1860. King's and Marischal were Scotland's third and fifth oldest universities respectively.

Robert Gordon's College (originally Robert Gordon's Hospital) was founded in 1729 by the merchant Robert Gordon, grandson of the map maker Robert Gordon of Straloch, and was further endowed in 1816 by Alexander Simpson of Collyhill. Originally devoted to the instruction and maintenance of the sons of poor burgesses of guild and trade in the city, it was reorganized in 1881 as a day and night school for secondary and technical education, and in the 1990s became co-educational and a day-only school. It also produced the Robert Gordon Institute of Technology, which in 1992 became the Robert Gordon University.

== Art and Architecture schools ==
Gray's School of Art, founded in 1886, is one of the oldest established colleges of art in the UK. It is situated in grounds at Garthdee on the edge of the city. It is now incorporated into Robert Gordon University.

The Scott Sutherland School of Architecture and The Built Environment (previously the Scott Sutherland School of Architecture; The Scott Sutherland School of Art Architecture and Design) is situated on the Garthdee Campus of the Robert Gordon University in Aberdeen, next to Gray's School of Art. Among other full-time and part-time courses; the School runs the a BSc Honours course in Architectural Studies and MArch masters in Architectural Studies. It also has a student-led lecture society and sponsored lecture series called 5710, creating a link between architectural practice and architectural education.

== Colleges ==
North East Scotland College has several campuses in Aberdeen and offers part-time and full-time courses leading to several different qualifications. It replaced Aberdeen College which was the largest further education institution in Scotland.

Northern College was a teacher training college with campuses in Aberdeen and Dundee. In 2000, the Aberdeen campus of Northern College became the University of Aberdeen School of Education. In 2006 the Hilton Campus of Northern College in Aberdeen was sold for housing development and demolished.

== State schools ==
There are currently 12 secondary schools and 54 primary schools which are run by the city council. The most notable are Cults Academy, Oldmachar Academy and Aberdeen Grammar School which are all rated in the top 20 Scottish secondary schools league tables.

Historically, the most famous of Aberdeen's schools is Aberdeen Grammar School, (now a comprehensive). Founded in 1263 it is one of the oldest schools in Britain, and is set in a Scottish baronial style building. It is celebrated as the school of Lord Byron.

== Private schools ==
There are a number of private schools in Aberdeen; Albyn School for Girls (co-ed as of 2006), St Margaret's School for Girls, the Hamilton School, Robert Gordon's College, the Total S.A. French School (for French oil industry families) and the International School of Aberdeen.

Following investigations by the police and the care commission in 2014, both the Hamilton school and the Waldorf school closed. Public sector schooling was made available for the displaced pupils.

== See also ==
- List of schools in Aberdeen
