= Coat of arms of Aberdeen =

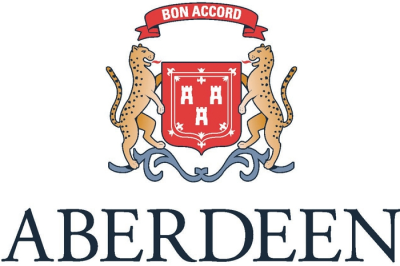
The arms of Aberdeen

The coat of arms of Aberdeen consists of three towers within a border decorated with fleurs-de-lis. This design is known to have been used on city seals from the 15th century onwards, if not earlier.

== Arms ==
Shield of the arms

The three towers represent the three buildings that stood on the three hills of mediaeval Aberdeen: Aberdeen Castle on Castle Hill, the city gate on Port Hill, and a chapel on St Catherine's Hill. The latter two are no longer in existence, and St Catherine's Hill has in fact been levelled.

Conversely the image of a single tower, rather than the triple, is often used in the city. Notably they can be seen in the arms of Aberdeen Grammar School, Robert Gordons College, Robert Gordon University and the University of Aberdeen.

The border of fleurs-de-lis, or royal tressure as it is described in heraldry, derives from the royal arms of Scotland, and was traditionally said to have been granted to the city by Robert the Bruce as a mark of royal favour, but may only date from the reign of James I.

In 1672, the Parliament of Scotland passed an act requiring all persons or bodies using arms to record them in a register maintained by Lord Lyon King of Arms. Accordingly, the arms of the "Royall Burgh of Aberdein" were recorded in the Lyon Register on February 25, 1674. The blazon was given as: gules, three towers triple-towered within a double-tressure counterflowered argent. Supported by two leopards proper; and in an escrol above "Bon Accord"

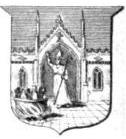
19th century engraving of the second shield

A second shield was also recorded, based on the city's counterseal. This consisted of a temple, with Saint Nicholas standing in the doorway praying over a cauldron of boiling children. This was blazoned: azure, a temple argent, St Nicholas standing in the porch, mitred and vested proper, with his dexter hand lifted up to heaven praying over three children in a boiling cauldron of the first, and holding in the sinister a crosier or.

These arms originated from an old legend surrounding St Nicholas, who is the city's patron saint due to his association with mariners. According to the legend, Nicholas had been travelling through his diocese, when he lodged for the night in a house on the wayside. Unbeknownst to Nicholas, his host was a cannibal, and had secretly been kidnapping local children for meat. When Nicholas's plate was placed before him, he immediately recognised the meat for what it was. Going over to the cauldron, he made the sign of the Cross, and the children were then restored to life.

Due to local government reorganisation, the arms have been regranted twice: in 1976 to the City of Aberdeen District Council, and in 1996 to Aberdeen City Council. As such, the arms are today the corporate property of the City Council.

No crest has ever accompanied the arms, but they may be displayed with a mural coronet, in right of Aberdeen's city status. Prior to the formation of the current council in 1996, a district council's coronet was used, representing Aberdeen's status as a district. This was made of gold, and was decorated with spikes and sheaves of wheat.

== Supporters ==
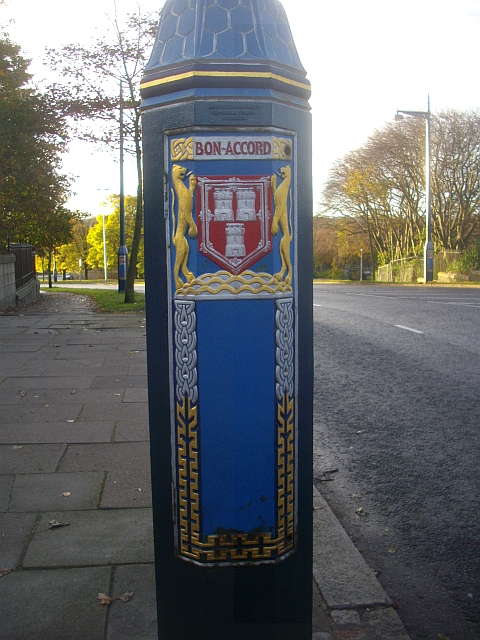
The arms displayed on a lamp-post at the Great Southern Road

The supporters are two leopards, though in early depictions they are sometimes shown as lions. According to legend, the beasts were granted by James I as a gesture of thanks to the burgh for underwriting his expenses while he was held captive in England. The city's local magazine is called the "Leopard" and when Union Bridge was constructed in the 19th century small statues of leopards in a sitting position were cast and placed along its railing tops.

There has been some controversy over whether the leopards ought to be represented in profile or with their faces towards the viewer. The former is nowadays more common, in accordance with the 1674 blazon.

== Motto ==
Banner of the arms

The motto of the city is Bon Accord, French for "Good Agreement". Legend tells that its use dates from the Wars of Scottish Independence in the 14th century, when Robert the Bruce and his men laid siege to Aberdeen Castle, before destroying it in 1308 and massacring the English Garrison, retaking Aberdeen for the townspeople. Bon Accord was the secret password used during the campaign.

The city's official toast is "Happy to meet, sorry to part, happy to meet again - Bon Accord!", which is based on an extract from the Masonic poem "The Final Toast" by David Lester Richardson.

The town of Bon Accord in the Canadian province of Alberta takes its name from the motto.
