= William Minto =

Scottish academic, critic, editor, journalist and novelist

William Minto (10 October 1845 – 1 March 1893) was a Scottish academic, critic, editor, journalist and novelist.

== Life ==
Minto was born at Nether Auchintoul, near Alford, Aberdeenshire. He was son of James Minto, a farmer, and his wife Barbara Copland.

He was educated at the University of Aberdeen, graduating as an M.A. in 1865 and "winning the leading prizes in mathematics, classics and philosophy". In 1866 he began studying at Merton College, Oxford, but left the following year without taking a degree.

He became assistant professor under Alexander Bain, who held the Regius Chair of Logic and the Regius Chair of English Literature at the University of Aberdeen. During this period he wrote the book, Manual of English Prose Literature, Biographical and Critical, which was published in 1872 and which was "distinguished by sound judgment and sympathetic appreciation".

In 1873 Minto moved to London and from 1874 to 1878 he contributed literary and political articles to The Examiner, and later he was on the leader-writing staff of The Daily News and The Pall Mall Gazette. During this period Minto "was considered to be an able and pungent critic of Lord Beaconsfield's imperial policies".

In 1880 Bain retired and Minto succeeded him as Regius Professor of Logic and English Literature at Aberdeen, a post he held until his death. "Though Logic and Rhetoric had long been combined in a single Chair at the Scottish universities, Minto's occupancy of the Chair was marked by a much great[er] [sic] emphasis on the study and teaching of literature than logic."

== Works written by Minto ==
=== Nonfiction ===
- Manual of English Prose Literature (1872)
- Characteristics of English Poets from Chaucer to Shirley (1874)
- Logic: Inductive and Deductive (1893)
- Daniel Defoe in the "English Men of Letters" series (Macmillan, 1879)
- University Extension Manual on Logic (1893)
- Plain Principles of Prose Composition (1893)
- English Literature under the Georges (1894); republished, with a biographical introduction by William Knight, as The Literature of the Georgian Era (1895).

=== Fiction ===
- The Crack of Doom (1886) – a science fiction novel
- The Mediation of Ralph Hardelot (1888) – a historical novel set during the Peasants' Revolt
- Was She Good or Bad? (1889) – a humorous novel of modern manners

=== Articles ===
- Numerous articles on literary subjects (including Lord Byron, Geoffrey Chaucer, Charles Dickens, Edgar Allan Poe and William Wordsworth) in the 9th edition (1875–89) of the Encyclopædia Britannica and reprinted in the tenth edition (1902).
- Articles on Thomas Dekker, John Dryden, John Stuart Mill, Alexander Pope, Sir Walter Scott, Edmund Spenser, Sir Richard Steele, Laurence Sterne, and William Wordsworth that were partly authored by Minto were published in the eleventh edition (1911) of the Encyclopædia Britannica and acknowledged as such at the end of each article.

== Works edited by Minto ==
- Sir Walter Scott, Lay of the Last Minstrel, Oxford, 1886
- Sir Walter Scott, Lady of the Lake, 1891
- Sir Walter Scott, Poetical works of Sir Walter Scott, Bart., 1887
- Autobiographical Notes of the Life of William Bell Scott, 1892

== Family ==
On 8 January 1880 Minto married Cornelia Beatrice, daughter of the Rev. Lewis Griffiths, rector of Swindon, Gloucestershire. His health began to decline in 1891. A trip to Greece gave him some respite but he died of his ailments on 1 March 1893.

He had two sons, William and Charles. On 2 July 1919 the elder son, Lt. Col. William Bain Griffiths Minto, "died of injuries received while firing [a] peace salute at Aberdeen".
