= Aberdeen's Mercat Cross =

Coordinates: 57°08′54″N 2°05′33″W

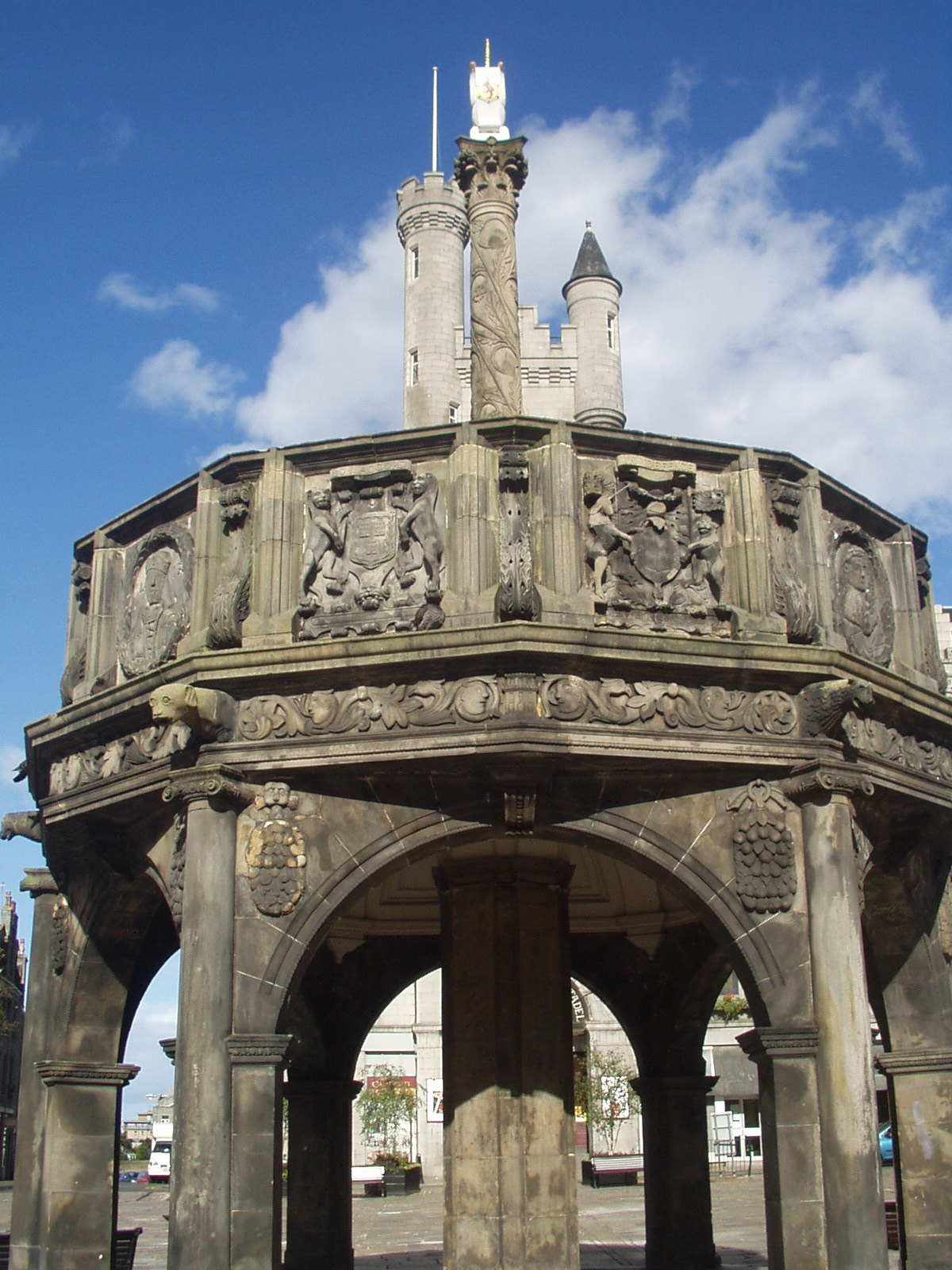
Aberdeen's Mercat Cross

Aberdeen's Mercat Cross was built in 1686 by John Montgomery, an Aberdeen architect. It is in the Castlegate area in the old burgh of New Aberdeen.

This open-arched structure, 21 ft (6 m) in diameter and 18 ft (5 m) high, is a large hexagonal base from the centre of which rises a shaft with a Corinthian capital, on which is the royal unicorn. The base is highly decorated, including medallions illustrating Scottish monarchs from James I to James VII and is supported by a series of open semi-circular arcades. According to local legend, the ghost of a unicorn can be seen to circle the Castlegate when a full moon is visible.

During the Jacobite rising of 1715 James Stuart, the Old Pretender, was declared king at the cross.
