= Regius Professor of Humanity =

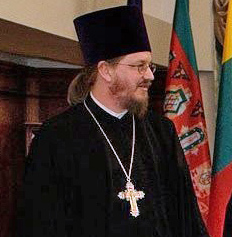
Fr John Behr, Regius Professor of Humanity since 2020

The Regius Chair of Humanity is a Regius Chair at the University of Aberdeen. The position was originally a professorship in Latin, like equivalent positions at Glasgow and Edinburgh, and existed in parallel with the Regius Chair of Greek. These two professorial chairs had their origins in the pre-existing Chairs of Greek and Humanity that existed at King's College and Marischal College, which were unified into the University of Aberdeen in 1860.

In 1979, the Regius Chair of Humanity was renamed the Regius Chair of Classics and the Regius Chair of Greek was abolished and merged into this position, formalising what may already have been an existing situation, as no Regius Professor of Greek had recently held office. However, the teaching of Classics at the university was then abolished in 1989.

In 2006, the name of the Regius Chair of Classics was restored to Regius Chair of Humanity. Since then, the position has been held by scholars within the School of Divinity, History, Philosophy and Art History, whose specialist interests have included Greek and Latin texts.

== List of Professors at King's College, Aberdeen ==
=== Professors of Greek (before 1860) ===
- 1754–1790: James Leslie
- 1790–1796: Gilbert Gerard
- 1797–1854: Hugh Macpherson
- 1854–1855: P. Campbell
- 1855–1860: William Duguid Geddes

=== Professors of Humanity (before 1860) ===
- 1669–1695: Patrick Gordon
- 1695–1739: A. Gordon
- 1739–1765: Thomas Gordon
- 1765–1817: William Ogilvie
- 1817–1847: Patrick Forbes
- 1847–1860: George Ferguson

== List of Professors at Marischal College, Aberdeen ==
=== Professors of Greek (before 1860) ===
- 1723: Thomas Haddow
- 1723–1757: Thomas Blackwell
- 1758–1782: William Kennedy
- 1782–1827: John Stuart
- 1827–1860: Robert James Brown

=== Professors of Humanity (before 1860) ===
- 1839–1851: John Stuart Blackie
- 1852–1860: Robert MacLure

== List of Professors at the unified University of Aberdeen ==
=== Regius Professors of Greek (1860–1979) ===
- 1860–1885: William Duguid Geddes (formerly Professor of Greek at King's College)
- 1886–1931: John Harrower
- 1931–1964?: Archibald Cameron
- 1964?–1979: Chair vacant

=== Regius Professors of Humanity (1860–1979) ===
- 1860–1868: Robert MacLure (formerly Professor of Humanity at Marischal College)
- 1868–1881: John Black
- 1881–1886: James Donaldson
- 1886–1911: William Mitchell Ramsay
- 1911–1937: Alexander Souter
- 1938–1952: Peter Noble
- 1952–1979: William Smith Watt

=== Regius Professors of Classics (1979–2006) ===
- 1980–1983: John M. Rist
- 1983–2006: Chair vacant

=== Regius Professors of Humanity (since 2006) ===
- 2007–2017: Jane Stevenson
- 2020–present: John Behr

== See also ==
- Professor of Humanity (Glasgow)
- MacDowell Professor of Greek
- Professor of Classics (Edinburgh)
- List of professorships at the University of Aberdeen

== Notes ==
- For all professors up to 1900, these lists are based on Morris, M. J. (2008). A Manly Desire to Learn: The Teaching of Classics in Nineteenth Century Scotland. p. 298.
