= The Senses and the Intellect =

1855 book by Alexander Bain

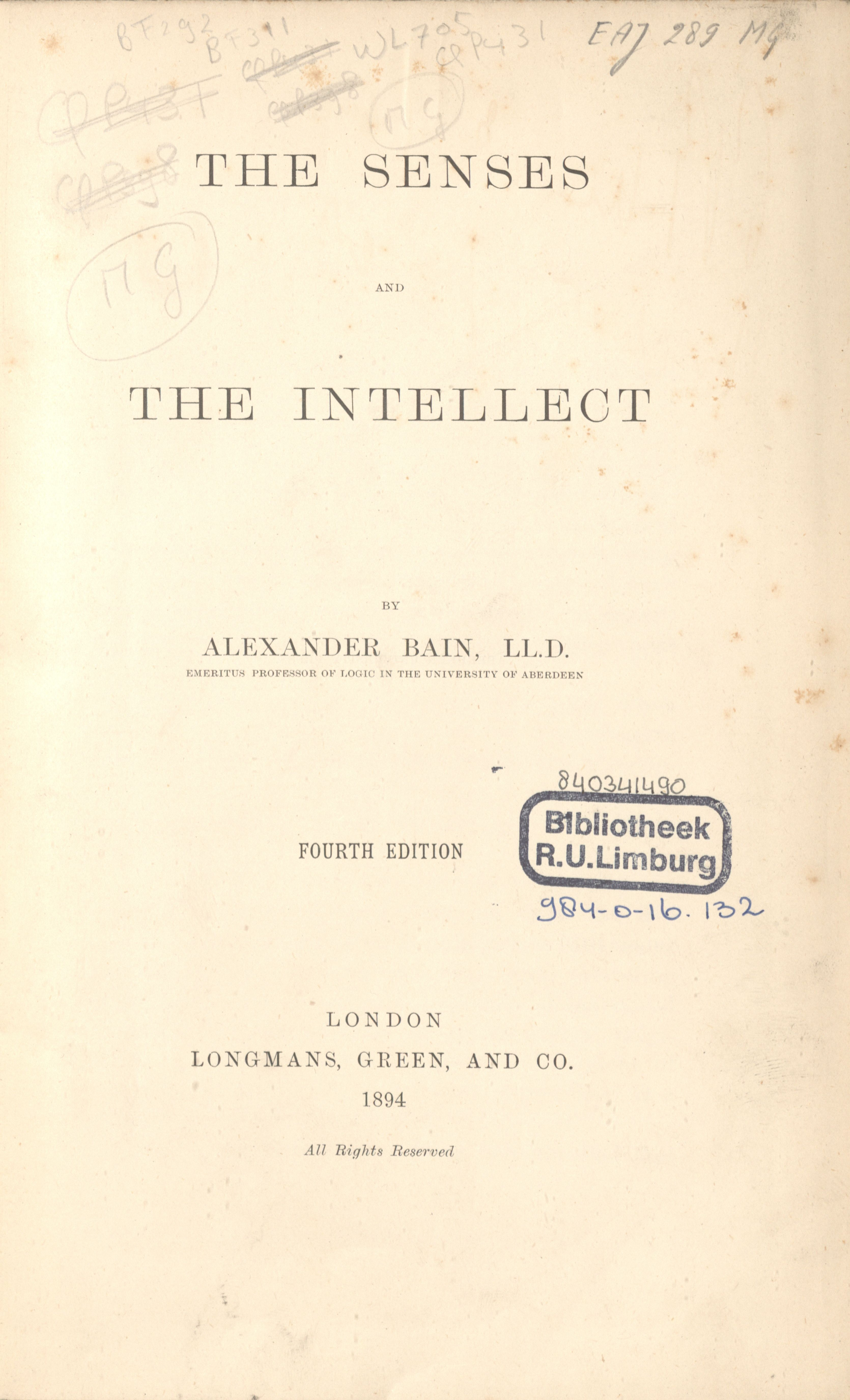
- Title page
- Author: Alexander Bain
- Language: English
- Publisher: John William Parker
- Publication date: 1855
- Publication place: Scotland
- ISBN: 1-855-06654-8

The Senses and the Intellect is a book by Alexander Bain that was first published in 1855 and published by John William Parker in London. In this treatise, Bain described two principal divisions of the mind, the senses and the intellect. The discussion on the other two aspects of the mind, the emotions and the will, was published by Bain four years later, in 1859, under the title The Emotions and the Will.

== Context ==
Bain had an academic background in moral philosophy and logic and is considered to be an associationist, alongside figures like John Locke, David Hume and his friend - John Stuart Mill.

In the early 1840s, Bain developed a keen interest in psychology, particularly in exploring the human senses through physiology. His work during this period culminated in a paper presented in 1844 titled On the Definition and Classification of the Human Senses, where he introduced the concepts of the muscular sense and organic sensibilities. Drawing from the associationist approach and displaying scepticism towards metaphysics, he expanded contemporary psychology in multiple ways. In the context of the will, he prioritized physiological explanations over metaphysical ones, using reflexes as proof that a type of will exists in human limbs, separate from consciousness. He aimed to identify the physiological links to mental states without adopting materialistic views. By 1851, influenced by Professor Sharpey's lectures on the brain and nervous system, Bain incorporated the idea of the Doctrine of Spontaneity into his writing. Following Sharpey's recommendation, Bain read the studies by French physiologist Longet's, which heavily influenced the first edition of The Senses and the Intellect. Bain's intensive drafting and redrafting continued until 1854. By 1855, with John Stuart Mill's recommended publisher – Parker – the book was published in June after being meticulously reviewed by Sharpey.

== Contents ==
The first edition of the treatise is 614 pages long and is divided into an introduction and two books.

=== Introduction ===
The introduction is further divided into two chapters. The first chapter defines the mind and ascribes three capacities to it: to feel, to act according to the feeling and to think. The second chapter discusses the nervous system, including the structures of the nerves, the spinal cord, and the encephalon. Bain justifies the need for detailed knowledge of human physiology, as "The Brain is the principal organ of the Mind". By expansion, Bain highlights his goal for a scientific explanation of psychological phenomena by means of physiology.

=== Book 1 - Movement, Sense and Instinct ===
In the first book of The Senses and the Intellect, Bain refers to the "inferior region" of the mind, characterized by fundamental sensations, movements, appetites, and instincts. He justifies this grouping, stating that the concepts he discusses are not significantly linked with higher cognitive processes, making them apt for discussion alongside sensations. Moreover, he argues that a deeper understanding of appetites and instincts enriches the intellectual discourse. The proximity of appetite to sensation and the natural sequencing of discussing all instinctual behaviors before intellectual acquisitions further guide this structure. The first book is organized into four chapters: the first focuses on spontaneous actions and movements; the second delves into the senses and sensations; the third examines appetites; and the fourth addresses instincts, preliminary emotions, and will. Through this structure, Bain aims to cover the foundational mental processes.

=== Book 2 - Intellect ===
In the second book, Bain delves into the study of the intellect, emphasizing its distinctiveness from other mental faculties such as emotion and volition. Bain identifies the intellect's defining feature – the ability to retain and recall sensations and mental states (even without external stimuli), distinguishing it as a capacity to "live both in ideas and actualities". Furthermore, the intellect has the inherent ability to discern and compare conscious states, with an inherent understanding of their agreements and differences. Such cognitive powers underpin acquired abilities and fuel human originality and inventiveness. Bain posits that consciousness might not be essential for all intellectual operations, drawing a clear distinction between it and other mental domains.

== Reception ==
After the release of the book, Bain continued working on the second volume, outlining the remaining aspects of the mind. As Parker was dissatisfied with the sales of The Senses and the Intellect, this became an obstacle for Bain's release of subsequent volume. The dispute was later resolved by Mill who promised to take liability for potential losses that the publisher might incur.

In 1876, William James published a review of Bain's works by stating "The thoroughness of the descriptive part of Bain's treatises, and the truly admirable sagacity of many of the psychological analyses and reductions they contain, has made them deservedly classical."

Both The Senses and the Intellect and The Emotions and the Will established Bain as a foundational contributor to the newly emerging study of psychology. His insistence on explanations rooted in physiology provided validity to his insights of philosophical origin.

Despite mixed receptions, Bain's ideas had a lasting influence. His attempt to bring together psychology and physiology foreshadowed the later development of behaviorism and experimental psychology in the 20th century. The Senses and the Intellect marks a transition from a purely philosophical and introspective approach to psychology.
