= Grupo Alexander Bain =

Grupo Alexander Bain (Alexander Bain Group) is a set of schools in Mexico City. Named after Scottish educator Alexander Bain, the group offers kindergarten, elementary school, and junior high.
