= Aberdeen Castle =

Castle in Aberdeen, Scotland

Aberdeen Castle (destroyed c.1308)
- Aberdeen, Scotland
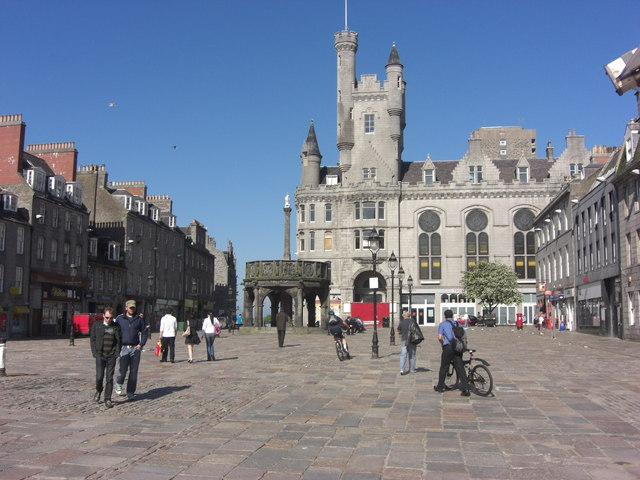
- Castlegate, Aberdeen

Site information
- Condition: Destroyed, no remains.

Location
- Coordinates: 57°08′57″N 02°05′25″W

Site history
- In use: until c.1308
- Demolished: c.1308

Garrison information
- Garrison: Variously between Scottish and English troops.

Aberdeen Castle was a late Middle Ages fortification, in Aberdeen, Scotland. It was situated on Castle Hill, a site today known as the Castlegate, and the location of the castle is now occupied by blocks of flats.

== Burned and demolished ==
It is thought the castle and fortifications were slighted by King Robert the Bruce as was his policy on recaptured castles in June 1308, during the Wars of Scottish Independence immediately following the Harrying of Buchan. Bruce and his men laid siege to the castle before massacring the English Garrison to prevent its use by the English troops of Edward II. It is said the Scots showed no mercy but "slew every man who fell into their hands. Edward I, indeed, had already set the example of executing his prisoners. It was not to be expected that the other side would fail to follow the same course" However, as of August 1308, Gilbert Pecche and the last troops were allowed to leave Aberdeen; though this is unlikely to be accurate. On 10 July 1308, English ships left Hartlepool to help the English garrison.

Legend tells that the city's motto, Bon Accord, came from the password used to initiate Bruce's final push and destruction of the castle.

== Surrender to the English ==
The castle was surrendered to the English in 1295, and on 14 April 1296, the English King, Edward I arrived in Aberdeen and stayed in the castle as part of his campaign in the east coast of Scotland, having defeated the Scots.

== Wallace ==
However, the following year, in 1297, after defeating the English at Dunnottar Castle, William Wallace marched his men to Aberdeen as part of their campaign to reclaim the east coast from the English army.

They found the English preparing to leave with an armada of one hundred ships. The speed of Wallace's arrival from Dunnottar caught the English unawares. At low tide, the stranded ships were attacked in the harbour: the crew and soldiers were slaughtered, the cargo was seized, and the ships were burned.

== John Balliol ==
The English Sheriff of Aberdeen, Sir Henry de Lazom, had been left in charge of the castle, but during the chaos of the attack, he defected and declared the castle in the name of the Scottish King, John Balliol.
