= List of professorships at the University of Aberdeen =

The following is a list of professorships at the University of Aberdeen.

== College of Arts and Social Sciences ==
- Aberdeen Asset Management Professor of Finance and Investment Management
- Jaffrey Professor of Political Economy
- MacRobert Professor of Land Economy
- Schlumberger Professor of Petroleum Economics

=== School of Divinity, History and Philosophy ===
- Regius Professor of Humanity
- Regius Chair of Logic
- Regius Chair of Moral Philosophy
- King's Chair of Systematic Theology (1620)
- Marischal Chair of Divinity (1616)
- Established Chair of Hebrew and Semitic Languages (1637)
- Burnett-Fletcher Chair of History
- Chair in Practical Theology and Pastoral Care

=== School of Language & Literature ===
- Regius Chair of English Literature

=== School of Law ===
- Professor of Jurisprudence
- Professor of Scots Law
- Professor of Civil Law
- Professor of Public Law

Notable former holders of the above posts include Prof David Daube, Prof Peter Stein, Neil Kennedy, and Prof T B Smith

== College of Life Sciences and Medicine ==
=== School of Biological Sciences ===
- Regius Chair of Botany

=== Schools of Medical Sciences and Medicine ===
- Chair of Anaesthesia and Intensive Care
- Regius Chair of Anatomy
- Chair of Bone Metabolism
- Chair of Child Health
- Chair of Environmental and Occupational Medicine
- Chair of Epidemiology
- Chair of Gastroenterology
- James Mackenzie Chair of General Practice
- Chair of Genetics
- Chair of Haematology
- Chair of Immunology
- Chair of Medical Education
- Chair of Medical Genetics
- Chair of Medical Mycology
- Chair of Medical Statistics
- Regius Chair of Medicine
- Chair of Medicine (Care of the Elderly)
- Chair of Medicine and Therapeutics
- Chair of Mental Health
- Chair of Microbiology
- Chair of Molecular and Cell Biology
- Chair of Molecular Toxicology
- Regius Chair of Obstetrics and Gynaecology (previously Regius Chair of Midwifery)
- Chair of Ophthalmology
- Sir Harry Platt Chair of Orthopaedic Surgery
- Chair of Paediatric Surgery
- Regius Chair of Pathology
- Regius Chair of Physiology
- Chair of Physiology & Pharmacology Education
- NHS Grampian Chair of Primary Care
- Chair of Public Health
- GHB Chair of Public Health Medicine
- Roland Sutton Chair of Radiology
- Chair of Reproductive Medicine
- Chair of Rheumatology
- Chair of Rural Health
- Regius Chair of Surgery
- Chair of Surgical Oncology

== College of Physical Sciences ==
=== School of Engineering and Physical Sciences ===
- Regius Chair of Natural History

=== School of Geosciences ===
This list is incomplete
