= New Aberdeen =

Neighbourhood in Aberdeen, Scotland

Coordinates: 57.14804°N 2.09337°W

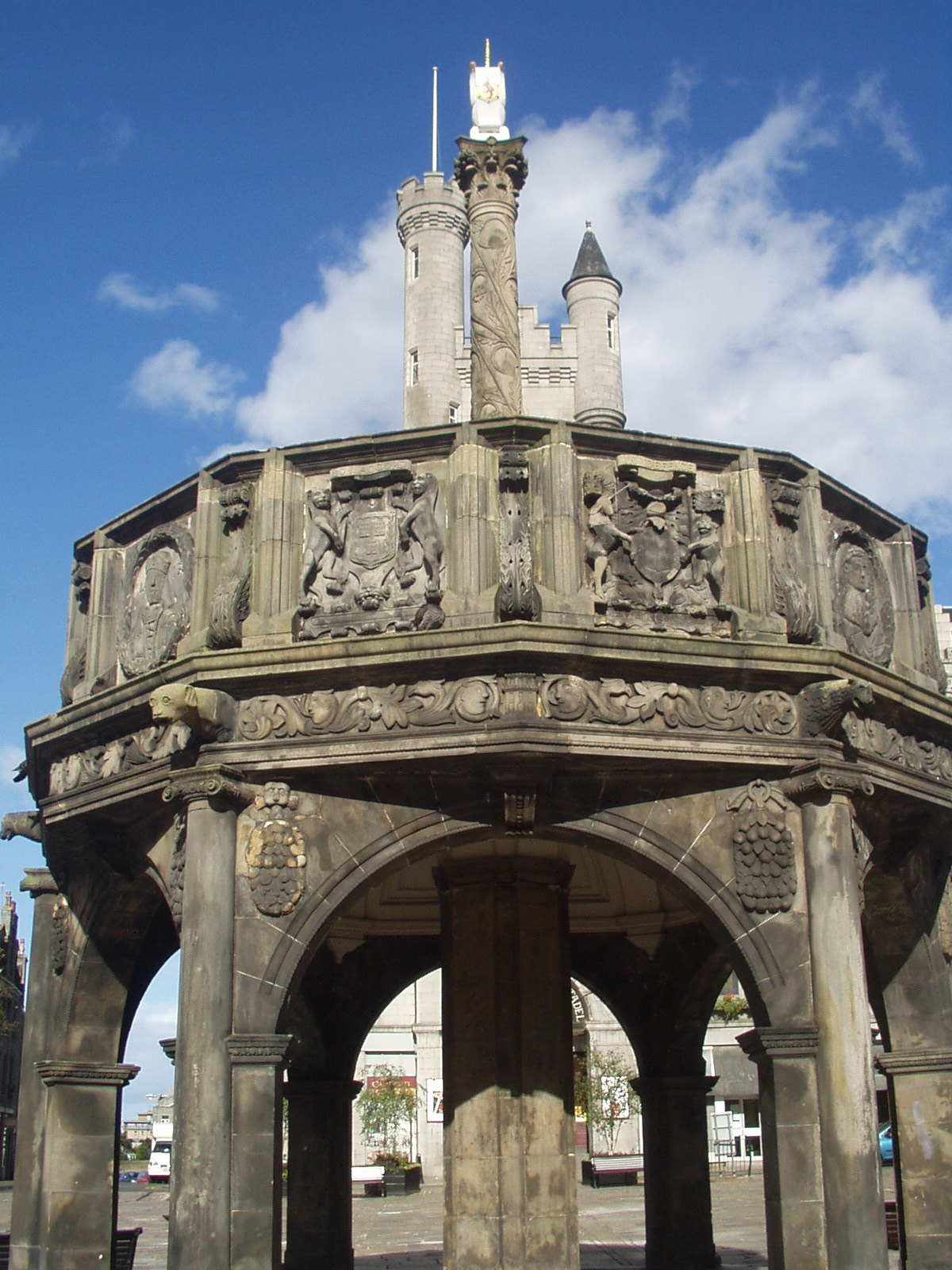
Aberdeen's Mercat Cross

New Aberdeen is a neighbourhood in Aberdeen, Scotland.

A Royal Burgh was established by the reign of David I in the middle of the twelfth century with Alexander II establishing a Guild of Merchants in New Aberdeen in 1222. It was a fishing and trading settlement where the river Denburn entered the Dee estuary. The burgh of New Aberdeen was merged with Old Aberdeen in 1891 to form the county of the city of Aberdeen.

The area has some of the oldest streets in Aberdeen dating from the Thirteenth and Fourteenth Centuries in New Aberdeen's historic marketplace the Castlegate where Aberdeen's Mercat cross is situated.

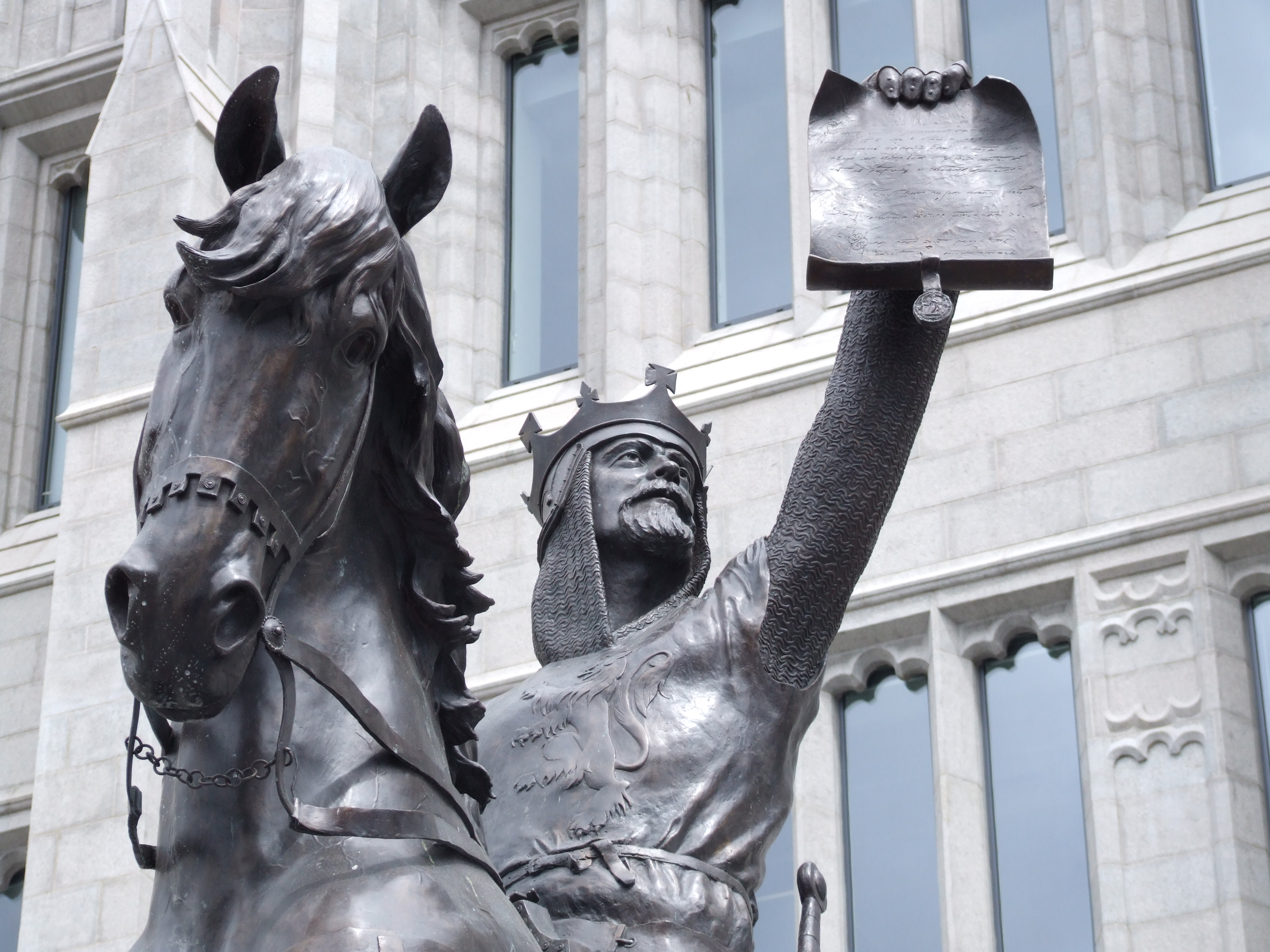
Statue of king Robert the Bruce in front of Marischal College.

Marischal College was founded in 1593 on the site of a disused medieval Franciscan friary by George Keith, 5th Earl Marischal of Scotland as a more Protestant alternative to Old Aberdeen's King's College. It was Scotland's second post-medieval "civic university", after the University of Edinburgh, created without a Papal bull and with a greater resemblance to the Protestant arts colleges of continental Europe to train post-Reformation Kirk clergy. and became known as Aberdeen's "Town College".
