= William Mitchell Ramsay =

British archaeologist and New Testament scholar (1851-1939)

Sir William Mitchell Ramsay FBA
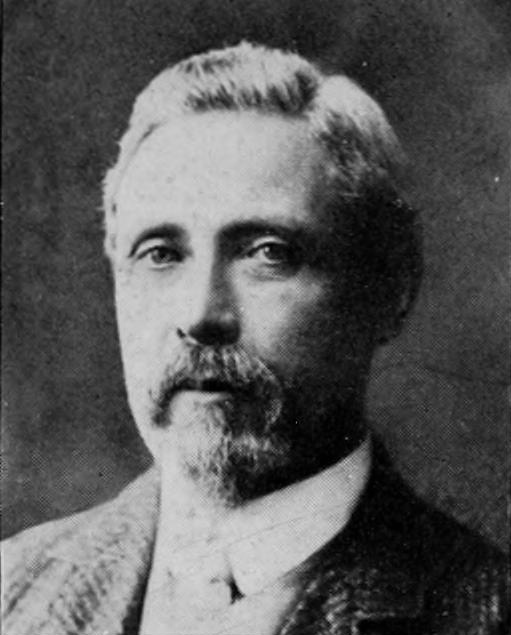
- Born: 15 March 1851; Glasgow, Scotland
- Died: 20 April 1939 (aged 88); Bournemouth, England
- Education: King's College, Aberdeen; St John's College, Oxford; University of Göttingen
- Spouse: Agnes
- Scientific career
- Fields: Theology; Archaeology

Sir William Mitchell Ramsay FBA (15 March 1851 – 20 April 1939) was a British archaeologist and New Testament scholar. He was the foremost authority of his day on the history of Asia Minor, and a leading scholar in the study of the New Testament.

Ramsay was educated in the Tübingen school of thought (founded by F. C. Baur) which doubted the reliability of the New Testament, but his extensive archaeological and historical studies convinced him of its historical accuracy. From the post of Professor of Classical Art and Architecture at Oxford, he was appointed Regius Professor of Humanity at Aberdeen.

Knighted in 1906 to mark his distinguished service to the world of scholarship, Ramsay also gained three honorary fellowships from Oxford colleges, nine honorary doctorates from British, Continental and North American universities, and became an honorary member of almost every association devoted to archaeology and historical research.

At the end of his career he became involved in Christian apologetics, which combined with his argumentative and caustic tendencies ultimately harmed his reputation among scholars. He died at his home in Bournemouth on the 20th of April, 1939.

== Early life and education ==
Ramsay was born in Glasgow, Scotland, the youngest son of a third-generation lawyer, Thomas Ramsay and his wife Jane Mitchell, daughter of William Mitchell. His father died when he was six years old, and the family moved from the city to the family home in the country district near Alloa. The help of his older brother and his maternal uncle, Andrew Mitchell of Alloa, made it possible for him to receive an education at the Gymnasium in Old Aberdeen. (Other relatives include Mary Ramsay and Agnes Margaret Ramsay, who contributed photographs and illustrations in Ramsay's later work, The Letters to the Seven Churches.)

Ramsay studied at the University of Aberdeen, where he achieved high distinction. He then won a scholarship to St. John's College, Oxford, where he obtained a first class in classical moderations (1874) and in literae humaniores (1876), He also studied Sanskrit under scholar Theodor Benfey at Göttingen. In 1880 Ramsay received an Oxford studentship for travel and research in Greece. At Smyrna, he met Sir C. W. Wilson, then British consul-general in Anatolia, who advised him on inland areas suitable for exploration, and made two long journeys with him in 1881 and 1882.

== Career ==
Ramsay travelled widely in Asia Minor and rapidly became the recognised authority on all matters relating to the districts associated with St Paul's missionary journeys and on Christianity in the early Roman Empire. Greece and Turkey remained the focus of Ramsay's research for the remainder of his academic career. In November 1881, he discovered two of the most important Phrygian monuments – the rock tombs "Aslantaş" (Lion Stone) and "Yılantaş" (Snake Stone), located close to the city centre of Afyon. In 1883, he discovered the world's oldest complete piece of music, the Seikilos epitaph. In 1890 he discovered inscriptions in an unknown Anatolian language, Pisidian, a description of which he published in 1895. He was known for his expertise in the historic geography and topography of Asia Minor and of its political, social, cultural, and religious history.

After becoming a Fellow of Exeter College, Oxford in 1882, from 1885 to 1886 Ramsay held the newly created Lincoln Professor of Classical Archaeology and Art at Oxford and became a fellow of Lincoln College (honorary fellow 1898). In 1886 Ramsay was appointed Regius Professor of Humanity at the University of Aberdeen. He remained affiliated with Aberdeen until his retirement in 1911.

=== Perspective on biblical historicity ===
When Ramsay first travelled to Asia Minor, the locations of many of the cities mentioned in the Book of Acts were not known. Later in life Ramsay stated, "Further study ... showed that the book could bear the most minute scrutiny as an authority for the facts of the Aegean world, and that it was written with such judgment, skill, art and perception of truth as to be a model of historical statement", also stating that one "may press the words of Luke in a degree beyond any other historian's".

Specifically, Ramsay's studies in Asia Minor led him to accept the trustworthiness of Luke's account in the Book of Acts. He wrote:

"I may fairly claim to have entered on this investigation without any prejudice in favour of the conclusion which I shall now attempt to justify to the reader. On the contrary, I began with a mind unfavourable to it for the ingenuity and apparent completeness of the Tubingen theory had at one time quite convinced me. It did not lie then in my line of life to investigate the subject minutely but more recently I found myself often brought in contact with the book of Acts as an authority for the topography, antiquities, and society of Asia Minor. It was gradually borne in upon me that in various details the narrative showed marvellous truth."

Regarding the authorship of the Pauline epistles Ramsay also concluded that all thirteen New Testament letters ostensibly written by Paul were in fact authentic.

=== Awards, recognition, leadership positions ===
Beginning in 1880, Ramsay began receiving honorary degrees, which eventually included a D.C.L. from Oxford, LL.D. recognition from St Andrews and Glasgow, and a D.D. from Edinburgh. In 1906, Ramsay was knighted for his scholarly achievements on the 400th anniversary of the founding of the University of Aberdeen. He was elected a member of learned societies in Europe and America and was awarded a medal by the University of Pennsylvania.

Ramsay was awarded the Gold Medal of Pope Leo XIII in 1893, and the Victoria Medal of the Royal Geographical Society in 1906. In 1919, Ramsay was named president of the Royal Geographical Society.

=== Legacy of scholarship ===
Ramsay is recognised as an important scholar in the archaeology of Asia Minor as well as the study of the New Testament, mainly from his 19th century work. In the 1960s, W. Ward Gasque listed three significant contributions of his to biblical studies: his conclusion of the reliability and accuracy of Luke-Acts; his identification of the Galatians with the Christians of Derbe, Lystra, Iconium, and Pisidian Antioch; and his emphasis on the historical context of the New Testament.

However, his later work suffered in scholarly reputation. Persuaded by William Robertson Nicoll, he worked as a popular apologist and his writings from that period have been dismissed by scholars for their speculative content. He also had a reputation as a controversialist, remaining argumentative even into old age.

== Personal life ==
Ramsay's wife, Agnes, accompanied him in many of his journeys; Lady Ramsay, granddaughter of Andrew Marshall of Kirkintilloch, was an author in her own right (Everyday Life in Turkey in 1897, and The Romance of Elisavet in 1899).

== Published works ==
- Ramsay, W. M. (1890). The Historical Geography of Asia Minor. Royal Geographical Society, Supplementary Papers. Vol. IV. London: John Murray.
- The Church in the Roman Empire Before AD 170 (1892).
- St Paul the Traveller and the Roman Citizen (1895; German translation, 1898).
- The Cities and Bishoprics of Phrygia (2 vols., 1895, 1897).
- Recent Research in Bible Lands: Its Progress and Results (1896).
- Impressions of Turkey during Twelve Years' Wanderings (1897).
- Was Christ born at Bethlehem? A Study on the Credibility of St. Luke (1898),
- A Historical Commentary on St. Paul's Epistle to the Galatians (1899).
- Ramsay, Sir W. M. (1920) [1900]. The Bearing of Recent Discovery on the Trustworthiness of the New Testament (4th ed.).
- The Education of Christ: Hill-Side Reveries (1902).
- Pictures of the Apostolic Church: Studies in the Book of Acts.
- The Church in the Roman Empire (1893).
- A Historical Commentary on the Epistles to the Corinthians. London: Hodder and Stoughton, 1900–1901.
- Ramsay, W. M. (1904). The Letters to the Seven Churches of Asia and their Place in the Plan of the Apocalypse (PDF).
- Pauline and other Studies in Early Christian History (1906).
- Studies in the History and Art of the Eastern Provinces of the Roman Empire (1906).
- The Cities of St Paul: Their Influence on His Life and Thought (1907).
- Luke the Physician, and Other Studies in the History of Religion (1908).
- The Revolution in Constantinople and Turkey; A Diary (1909).
- The Thousand and One Churches (with Gertrude L. Bell, 1909).
- Pictures of the Apostolic Church: Its Life and Teaching (1910).
- The First Christian Century: Notes on Dr. Moffatt's Introduction to the Literature of the New Testament (1911).
- An Historical Commentary on the Pastoral Epistles. London: Hodder and Stoughton, 1909–1911.
- Sketches in the Religious Antiquities of Asia Minor (1913).
- The Imperial Peace: An Ideal in European History (1913).
- The Teaching of Paul in Terms of the Present Day (1913).
- Recent Research and the New Testament (1914).
- The Making of a University: What We Have to Learn From Educational Ideals in America (1915).
- Ramsay, William Mitchell (1917). The Intermixture of Races in Asia Minor: Some of its Causes and Effects. Proceedings of the British Academy, Vol. VII. London: Oxford University Press.
- Asianic Elements in Greek Civilization. The Gifford Lectures in the University of Edinburgh, 1915-16 (1927; 2nd enlarged ed., 1928).
- Hastings' Dictionary of the Bible, Supplement, Numbers, Hours, Years and Dates, Religion of Greece and Asia Minor, Roads and Travel.

As well there are articles in learned periodicals, and in the 9th, 10th and 11th editions of the Encyclopædia Britannica, and in the Hastings' Dictionary of the Bible, including Achaia, Adramyttium, Antioch in Pisidia, Asia, Asiarch, Bithynia, Cappadocia, Caria, Chios, Churches (Robbers of), Cilicia, Cnidus, Colossae, Corinth, Cos, Delos, Derbe, Diana, Ephesian, Ephesus, Galatia, Galatia (Region of), Galatians, Halicarnassus, Hierapolis, Iconium, Laodicea, Lasea, Lycaona, Lycia, Lydia, Lystra, Mallus, Miletus, Myndus, Myra, Mysia, Nicopolis, Pamphylia, Patara, Perga, Pergamus, or Pergamum, Phasaelis, Philadelphia, Phoenix, Phrygia, Pisidia, Pontus, Rhegium, Rhodes, Samothrace, Sardis, Smyrna, Syracuse, Tarsus, Thracia, Town Clerk, Troas, Tyrannus.

== See also ==
- Christian apologetics
- Parlais

== Sources ==
- Letters to the Seven Churches, Preface. (William Mitchell Ramsay)
