= Jane Stevenson (historian) =

British historian and author

Jane Barbara Stevenson (born 1959) is a British historian, literary scholar, and author.

== Education and career ==
Stevenson was born in London and brought up in London, Beijing and Bonn. She studied Anglo-Saxon, Norse and Celtic at Newnham College, Cambridge, completing that tripos in the upper second class in 1980.

She went on to lecture in history at Sheffield University, and literature and history at the University of Aberdeen; from 2007 to 2017, she was Regius Professor of Humanity there. Since 2017, she has been Senior Research Fellow at Campion Hall, Oxford.

== Selected works ==
- Stevenson, Jane; Davidson, Peter, eds. (1997). The Closet of the Eminently Learned Sir Kenelme Digbie, Kt., Opened. London: Prospect Books. ISBN 978-0907325765.
- Stevenson, Jane; Davidson, Peter, eds. (2001). Early Modern Women Poets: An Anthology. Oxford: Oxford University Press. ISBN 978-0198184263.
- Stevenson, Jane (2005). Women Latin Poets: Language, Gender, and Authority, from Antiquity to the Eighteenth Century. Oxford: Oxford University Press. ISBN 978-0198185024.
- Stevenson, Jane (2007). Edward Burra: Twentieth-Century Eye. London: Jonathan Cape. ISBN 978-0224078757.
- Stevenson, Jane (2018). Baroque between the Wars. Oxford: Oxford University Press. ISBN 9780198808770.
- Stevenson, Jane (2021). The Light of Italy: The Life and Times of Federico Da Montefeltro, Duke of Urbino. London: Head of Zeus. ISBN 9781800241978.
- Stevenson, Jane (2022). Women and Latin in the Early Modern Period. Leiden: Brill. ISBN 9789004529755.

=== Fiction ===
- Stevenson, Jane (1999). Several Deceptions. London: Jonathan Cape. ISBN 978-0224059398.
- Stevenson, Jane (2000). London Bridges. London: Jonathan Cape. ISBN 978-0224059404.
- Stevenson, Jane (2002). The Winter Queen. Boston, MA: Houghton Mifflin. ISBN 978-0618149124. (original title Astraea London: Jonathan Cape, 2001)
- Stevenson, Jane (2003). The Shadow King. Boston, MA: Clarion Books. ISBN 978-0618149131. (original title The Pretender London: Jonathan Cape, 2002)
- Stevenson, Jane (2003). The Empress Of The Last Days. London: Jonathan Cape. ISBN 978-0224061421.
- Stevenson, Jane (2005). Good Women. London: Jonathan Cape. ISBN 978-0224073516.
