= Central Library, Aberdeen =

Aberdeen Central Library
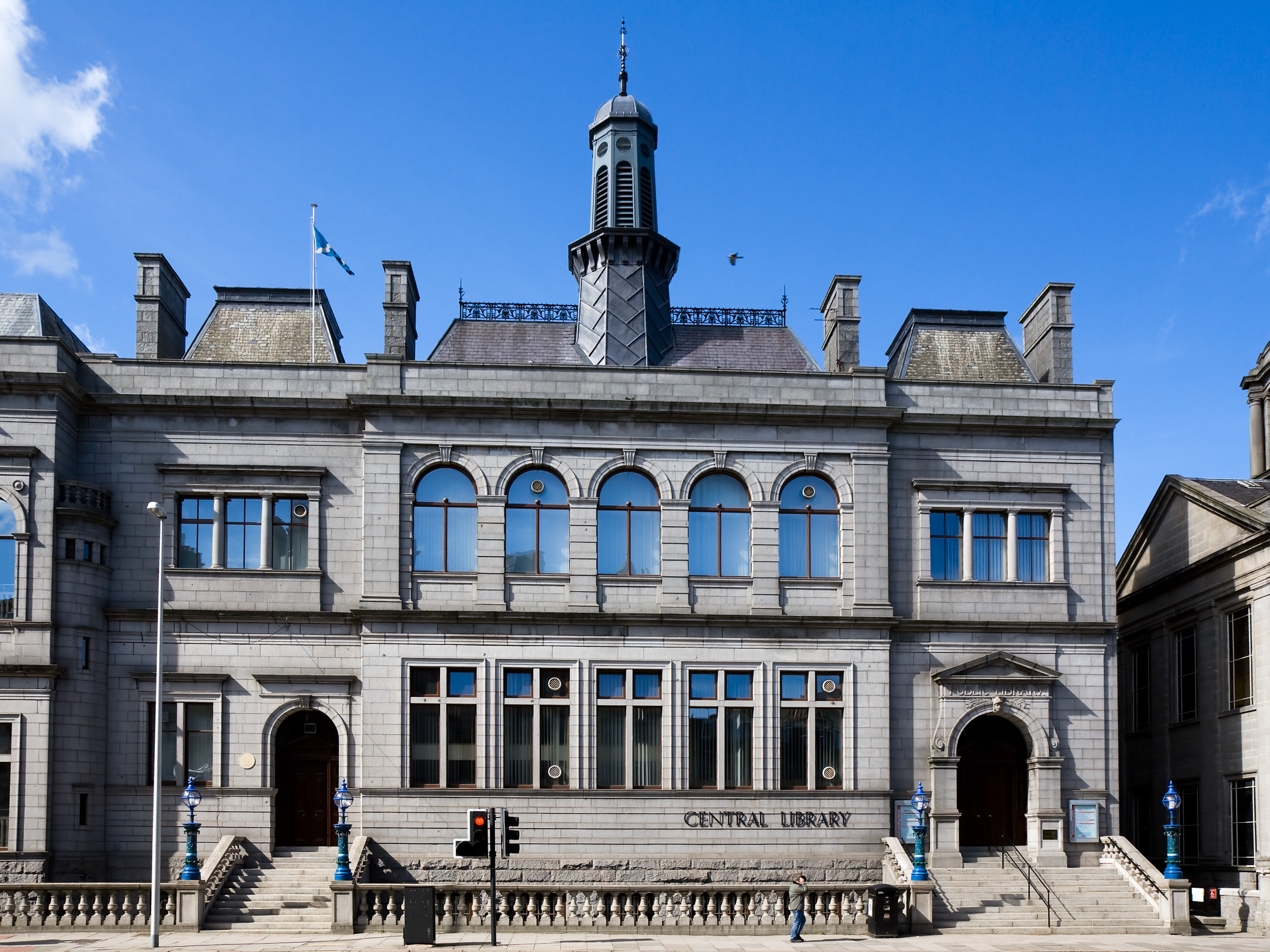
- Aberdeen Central Library

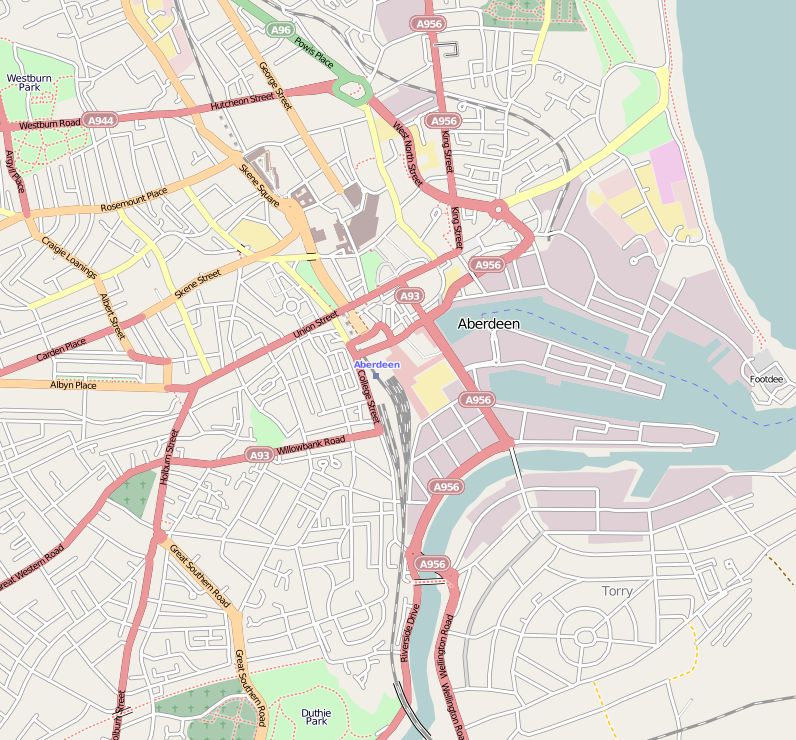
- Location within Central Aberdeen

General information
- Type: Library
- Location: Aberdeen, Scotland
- Coordinates: 57°8′52.44″N 2°6′21.6″W
- Inaugurated: 5 July 1892

The Central Library of Aberdeen in Scotland is located on Rosemount Viaduct and is the main library for the city.

== History ==
The library is housed in a category C(S) listed building. It cost £10,000 to build and was publicly funded through local campaigning that began in 1889. It was opened 5 July 1892 by Andrew Carnegie after he and his wife contributed £2000 to the construction process. It is one of a group of three civic buildings - the other two being St Mark's Church & His Majesty's Theatre - known as "Education, Salvation and Damnation."

== Collection ==
The library contains large collections of local maps, over 15,000 photographs, birth and death records and a collection of local newspapers. Much of the library's stock is held on microfilm.
