= Castlegate, Aberdeen =

Small area of Aberdeen, Scotland

Coordinates: 57.14804°N 2.09337°W

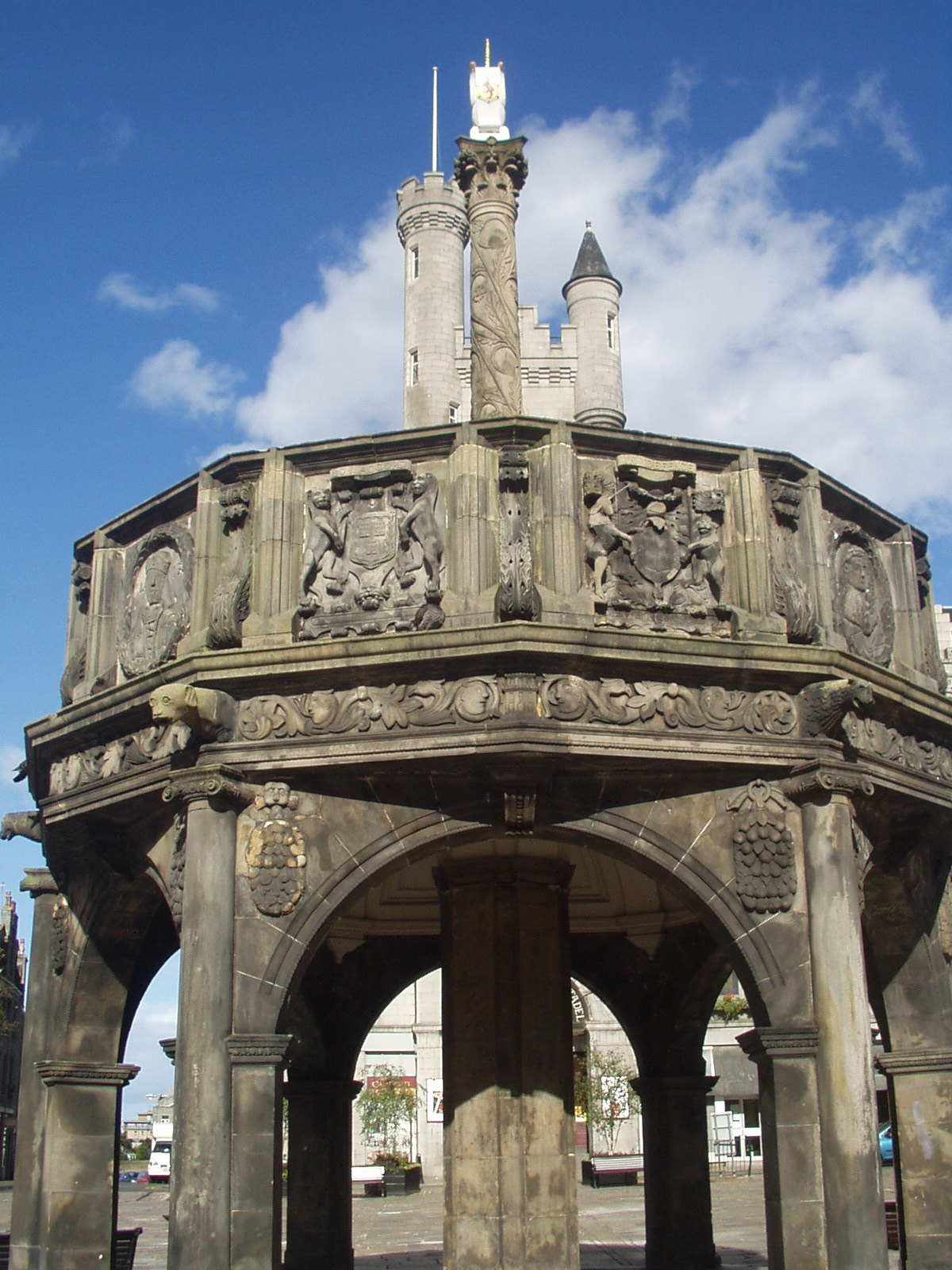
Aberdeen's Mercat Cross

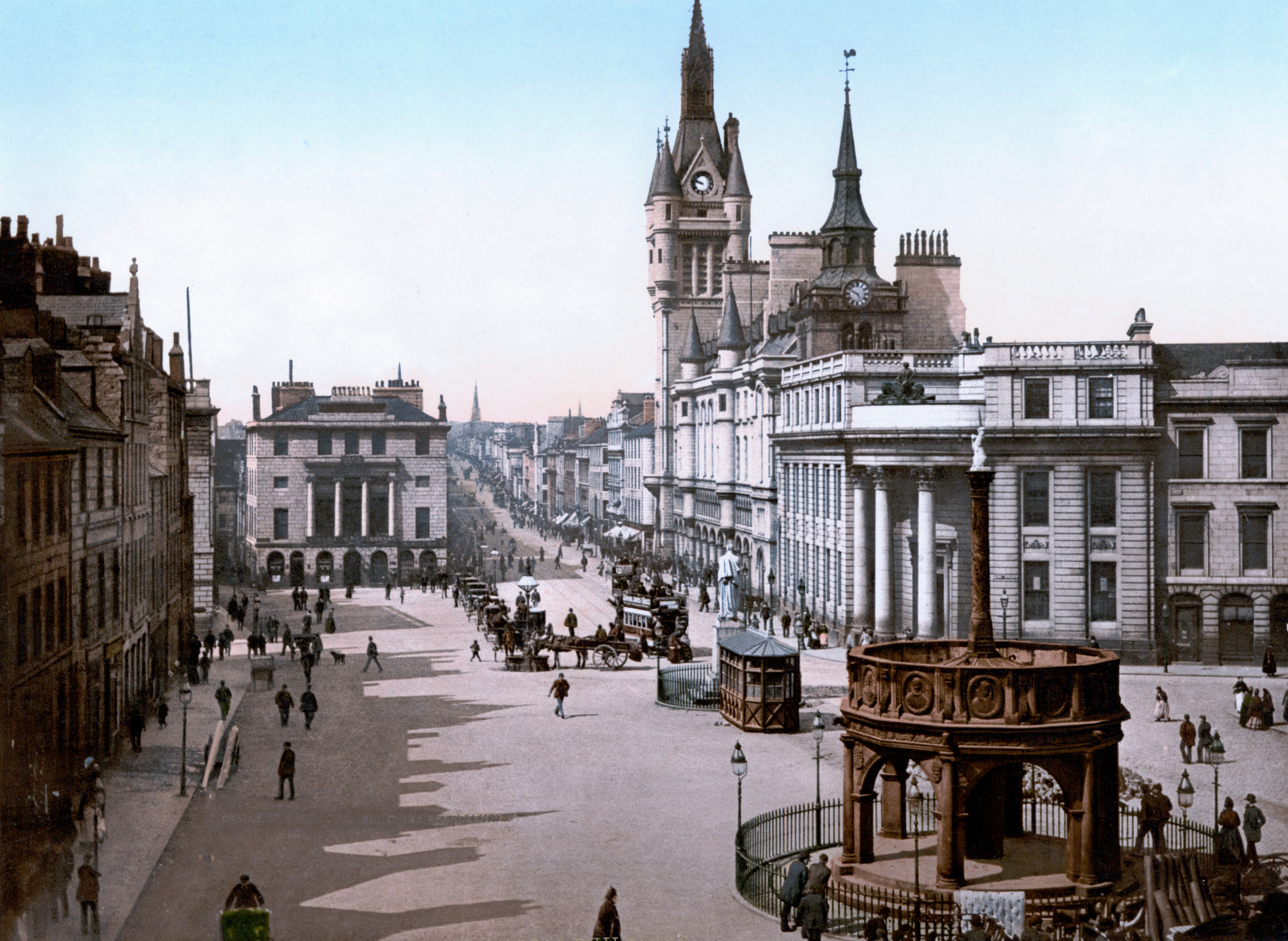
The Castlegate and Union Street (c.1900)

Castlegate is a small area of Aberdeen, Scotland, located centrally at the east end of the city's main thoroughfare Union Street. Generally speaking, locals consider it to encompass the square at the end of Union Street where the Mercat Cross and Gallowgate are located.

At the upper end of Castlegate stands The Salvation Army Citadel, an effective castellated mansion, on the site of the medieval Aberdeen Castle. Castlegate was named after the site of the castle gates until their destruction in 1308.

Aberdeen's Mercat Cross was built in 1686 by John Montgomery, a native architect. This open-arched structure, 21 ft (6 m) in diameter and 18 ft (5 m) high, is a large hexagonal base from the centre of which rises a shaft with a Corinthian capital, on which is the royal unicorn. The base is highly decorated, including medallions illustrating Scottish monarchs from James I to James VII. According to local legend, the ghost of a unicorn can be seen to circle the Castlegate when a full moon is visible.

Originally erected opposite the Mercat Cross, a statue of George Gordon, 5th Duke of Gordon, erected in 1844, was relocated to Golden Square in the 1950s.

To the east of Castle Street were the Castlehill Barracks, which were demolished in 1965 and replaced with two tower blocks.

The Gallowgate, just off the main square, is named after the former site of the gallows. A small area of the old granite road pavings remains in the bus lane, next to the courts, just the spot where public hangings were conducted.

To the west, just off the main square, is the Castlegate Well, which is no longer used. A small bronze statue was erected over the top by William Lindsay, a goldsmith then in charge of the city's water.

The Castlegate was used as a terminus for the Aberdeen Corporation Tramways system and later for buses.
