= List of professorships at the University of Edinburgh =

Established professorships at the University of Edinburgh

The title of the professorship is followed by the date of foundation. Dates in italics indicate the year of foundation of lectureships on which chairs were based. Academic members of staff at Edinburgh were known as 'Regents' until William Carstares restructured the University in 1708, although five Chairs predate these reforms. The University can also create 'personal' chairs, that is, professorships awarded to an individual which come to an end when the individual dies or retires, which are not listed here. The Regius Professorships are created by the reigning monarch. As of November 2024, the list appears incomplete.

== Professorships ==
- Chair of Divinity (1620)
- Chair of Hebrew and Oriental Languages (1642), now the Chair of Hebrew and Old Testament Studies
- Chair of Mathematics (1674)
- Chair of Medicine (1685)
- Chair of Ecclesiastical History (1694)
- Regius Chair of Public Law and the Law of Nature and Nations (1707)
- Chair of Moral Philosophy (1708)
- Chair of Greek (1708)
- Chair of Humanity (1708)
- Chair of Logic & Metaphysics (1708)
- Chair of Civil Law (1710)
- Chair of Chemistry (1713) (founded as 'Chair of Physik and Chymistry' where 'physik' = medicine)
- Chair of Universal History & Greek & Roman Antiquities (1719) (from 1909, 'Constitutional History', and from 1945, 'Constitutional Law and History')
- Chair of Scots Law (1722)
- Chair of Botany (1738), now the Regius Chair of Plant Sciences
- Chair of Midwifrey (1756) now the Chair of Gynaecology and Reproductive Sciences
- Regius Chair of Rhetoric and English Literature (1762)
- Chair of Natural History (1767)
- Regius Chair of Astronomy (1785)
- Regius Chair of Clinical Surgery (1802)
- Regius Chair of Forensic Medicine (1807)
- Chair of Military Surgery (1806, abolished 1856)
- Reid Professorship of Music (1833)
- Regius Chair of Sanskrit (1862), now the Regius Chair of South Asian Language, Culture and Society
- Regius Chair of Engineering (1868)
- Chair of Commercial and Political Economy and Mercantile Law (1870)
- Regius Chair of Geology (1871)
- Watson Gordon Chair of Fine Art (1880)
- Chair of Celtic Languages, Literature, History & Antiquities (1882)
- Sir William Fraser Chair of Scottish History and Palaeography (1901)
- Abercromby Chair of Archaeology (1927)
- Edward Clark Professor of Child Life and Health (1931)
- Ogilvie Professor of Human Geography (1931)
- Grant Chair of Dermatology (1946) - First such chair in Great Britain
- Forbes Chair of Medical Radiology (1947)
- Forbes Chair of Organic Chemistry (1947)
- Forbes Chair of Surgical Neurology (1947)
- Forbes Chair of English Language (1948)
- George Harrison Law Chair of Orthopaedic Surgery (1947)
- Chair of Chemical Technology (1955), renamed Chair of Chemical Engineering (1963)
- Grierson Professor of English Literature (1950)
- Masson Professor of English Literature
- Chair of Electrical Engineering (1960), renamed Bert Whittington Chair of Electrical Power Engineering (2002)
- Chair of Civil Engineering (1963)
- Maclaurin Chair of Mathematics (1964)
- Tovey Professor of Music (1965)
- Chair of Statistics (1966)
- Crum Brown Chair of Chemistry (1967)
- Chair of Applied Mathematics (1968)
- Salvesen Chair of European Institutions (1968)
- Chair in Building Science (1970)
- Lord President Reid Chair of Law (1972)
- Chair of Fire Engineering (1973)
- Chair of Microelectronics (1979)
- Chair of Integrated Electronics (1986)
- Chair of Civil Engineering Construction (1989)
- Chair of Environmental Engineering (1997)
- Chair of Interfacial Engineering (1997)
- Chair of Materials (1998)
- Chair of Structural Mechanics (2006)
- Chair of Power Plant Engineering and Carbon Capture (2010)
- Chair of Synthetic Biology (2013)
- Chair of Topographic Imaging (2013)
- Crawford Tercentenary Chair of Chemistry (2014)
- Chair of Chemical Reaction Engineering (2015)
- Chair of Combustion Engines (2015)
- Chair of Energy Storage (2015)
- Chair of Future Infrastructure (2015)
- Chair of Materials Engineering (2015)
- Chair of Structural Engineering (2015)
- A. G. Leventis Chair of Byzantine Studies (2015)
- Will Davidson Chair of Law (2016)
- Jason Reese Chair of Multiscale Fluid Mechanics (2019)
