= Analecta Graeca Minora =

18th-century Ancient Greek language schoolbook

- Language: Ancient Greek, Latin
- Subject: Ancient Greek language
- Genre: School textbook
- Publisher: Andrew Dalzell
- Publication date: 18th century (first edition)
- Publication place: United Kingdom
- Media type: Print
- Preceded by: Analecta Graeca Majora

Analecta Graeca Minora is an Ancient Greek language schoolbook published by the Scottish educator Andrew Dalzell.

== History ==
The first edition of Analecta Graeca Minora, compiled by Andrew Dalzell, then Professor of Greek at the University of Edinburgh, was released in the 1790s. Analecta Graeca Majora was the first established work in the series.

After the book had been published a third time in Edinburgh, a new edition appeared in Leipzig, edited by Johann Gottfried Grohmann, Professor of Philosophy at the University of Leipzig. After Grohmann's revision and endorsement for young readers in his country, the book gained international recognition as a useful educational resource. The Leipzig edition influenced Dalzell's corrections and additions (such as the adoption of a subject index and rearrangement of notes). In January 1801, the fourth edition of Analecta Graeca Minora, edited by Dalzell, was published in London and Edinburgh.

It was regularly used as a classical language schoolbook for students of the Greek language throughout the nineteenth century. The text is in Greek with the preface and notes in Latin. The preface notes that the Analecta Graeca Majora was too advanced for beginners, prompting the creation of a simplified companion. It contains carefully selected texts that engage learners while fostering appreciation for the Greek language. The book explores themes ranging from history to philosophy and literature. The collection of classic Greek texts includes extracts from Tyrtaeus, Xenophon, Anacreon, and more. While some fall outside the Golden Age of Greek literature, the fables and poetry were selected for their appeal and elegance.

== Translations ==
Over the years, editions were released in various languages, with improved material. George Dunbar reproduced Analecta Graeca Minora in 1821. In 1831, James Hamilton published his English translation of Analecta Graeca Minora, using the Hamiltonian system. James Bailey published an English translation in 1835. Rev. Percival Frost's 1863 translation of Analecta Graeca Minora featured introductory material, English annotations, and a glossary. Wilhelm Kroll translated a German version, published in Greifswald, Germany, in 1901.
