= Professor of Classics (Edinburgh) =

Professor of Classics University of Edinburgh
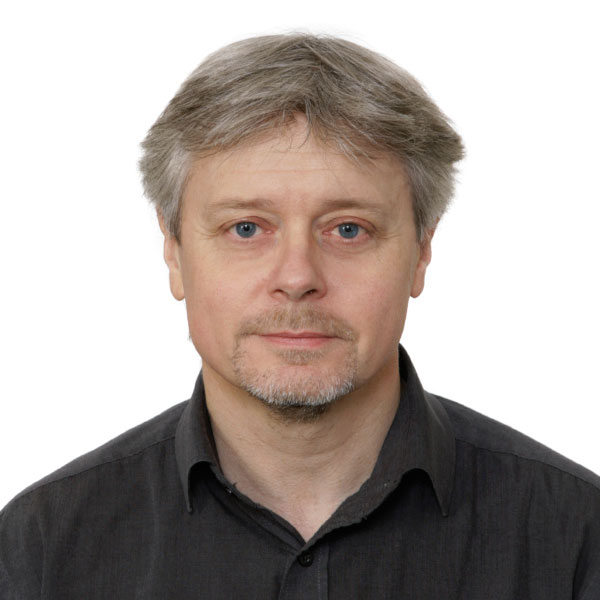
- Incumbent; Douglas Cairns since 2004
- Classics
- First holder: Laurence Dundas (1708), William Scott Primus (1708).

The Professor of Classics at the University of Edinburgh is the established Chair in Classics in the School of History, Classics and Archaeology. Since 2004, the Chair has been held by Douglas Cairns. Greek and Latin were compulsory for all students at Edinburgh until 1892, when Latin alone could be substituted for Greek.

In 1981 the Chair of Greek was left vacant by the retirement of A. J. Beattie, and in 1982 the Chair of Humanity soon followed with the retirement of Ian Campbell. In 1987 the Chairs were reconstituted to form the Professor of Classics.

== History ==
Originally, the Chair was divided between the historical Departments of Humanity (Latin) and Greek, and these two Chairs were established during William Carstares restructuring of the University along Dutch lines which abolished the regenting system and created the Faculty of Arts. Bower notes that the Universities of Amsterdam, Leiden and Utrecht, on which Carsatres' reforms had been based, did not have Chairs of Humanity but, rather, Chairs of Greek (Gracce Linguae Historiarum et Eloquentiae Professor), and he highlights the unique foundation of the Humanity chair. However, Carstares' reforms did not establish the first professorships at Edinburgh, since a Chair of Divinity had existed since 1620, and a Chair of Hebrew was appointed alongside the four Regents in 1642, with a Chair of Mathematics added in 1674 and of Physic (Medicine) in 1685.

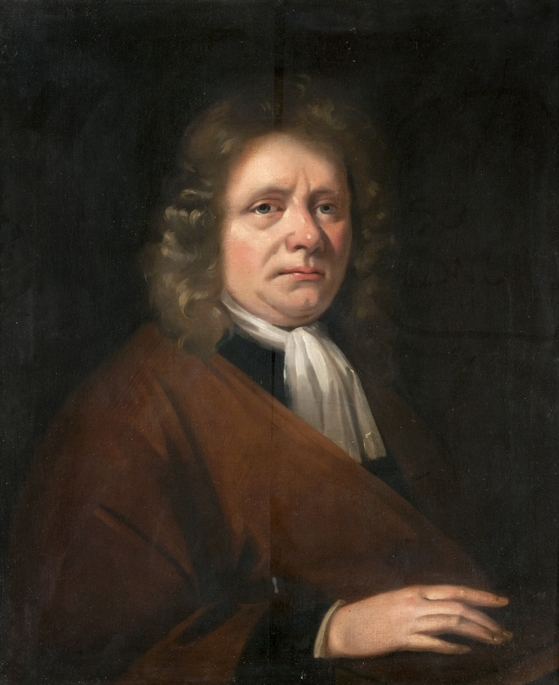
William Carstares, Principal of the University 1703-15, was the driving force behind the creation of 'Dutch' style Chairs at Edinburgh.

The former Regents of Humanity, William Scott Primus appointed as a Regent in 1695 and Laurence Dundas appointed as a Regent in 1690, who had taught Greek and Latin before Carstares' reforms (the first regens humaniorum literarum were appointed in 1583), were created the inaugural holders of each Chair by Royal Warrant. At William Scott's creation he was granted the honorific title 'Regius Professor', which had been similarly given to the new Chair of Law, since he had: 'obtained a patent from the Crown for the profession of Greek, by which he was constitute her Majesty's sole Professor of Greek in the University of Edinburgh'. However, ultimately, Scott failed to get a direct grant from the Crown, he was not made Professor under his specific royal patent, and the honorific has not been retained. Unless candidates for the professorships already held Chairs they were subject to a 'trial', that is, an examination of their Greek and Latin before their appointment. However, John Ker, already Professor of Greek at Aberdeen and John Hill, Professor of Greek at St Andrews, avoided such ordeals for it would have been considered insulting to have tested the Professor of another university. Further, this practice led to something of a curiosity during the election of George Stuart in 1741 to the Chair of Humanity when both candidates:

'agreed to transmit a message to the electors, stating that each believed the other to be qualified, and that they were rather inclined to refer it to their own choice, without putting them to additional trouble.'

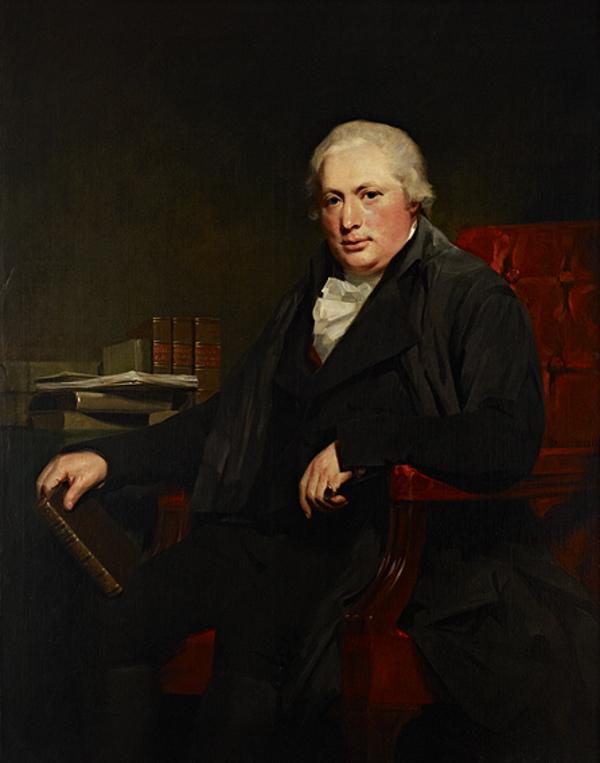
Andrew Dalzel, Professor of Greek from 1772-1805, by Henry Raeburn.

The Chairs in Greek and Humanity at the ancient Scottish universities, whose incumbent professors 'occupied an especial place in the culture of these cities', all came to be quite distinct, and Morris writes (concerning their foundation and holders in the 19th century):

'In terms of appointments to chairs in Greek or Humanity each Scottish university seemed to follow a different tradition: the chair of Greek at Glasgow was the preserve of Oxbridge educated scholars [e.g., Daniel Sandford (scholar), Edmund Law Lushington, Richard Claverhouse Jebb]; at Edinburgh no Englishman was successful in applying for either chair [until Harry Goodhart in Humanity and Arthur Wallace Pickard-Cambridge in Greek], whilst at Aberdeen the successful applicants were invariably graduates from that very university.'

Election to the Chairs in the contentious years surrounding the Disruption of 1843 became a proxy for Scotland's religious politics. When J. S. Blackie sought the Chair of Greek he was in competition with the Reverend Charles McDouall, who was prevented from taking the Chair in Hebrew owing to the influence of the Presbytery of Edinburgh, Sir Wiliam Smith, a nonconformist Dissenter who could not, as a result, teach at Oxford or Cambridge, Edmund Lushington, John Conington an avowed Anglo-Catholic, and Leonhard Schmitz, then Rector of the Royal High School. McDouall was viewed as the Free Church candidate, and Schmitz the Episcopalian candidate, meanwhile the maverick Blackie had refused to unreservedly sign the Confession of Faith at Marischal owing to his sympathies with German rationalism. Indeed, Blackie and his supporters had actually worried that a charge of heresy might be raised against him during the campaign. Blackie eventually won by a single vote -- the casting vote of the Lord Provost.

== Prizes named for the professors ==
S. H. Butcher gives his name to the Butcher Memorial Prize in Greek, awarded to the best student in Greek 1, and William Scott and George Dunbar to the Scott and Dunbar Prize in Greek, awarded to the most deserving student in the Greek class.

At Laurence Dundas' death in 1734 he 'bequeathed 9000 merks (£500) as a perpetual fund for educating three bursars, with a preference to persons with the surname of Dundas'.

William Sellar who, along with Harry Goodhart, gives his name to the Sellar, Goodhart and Giles Classical Library of the Department of Classics which was instituted by private subscription in 1897.

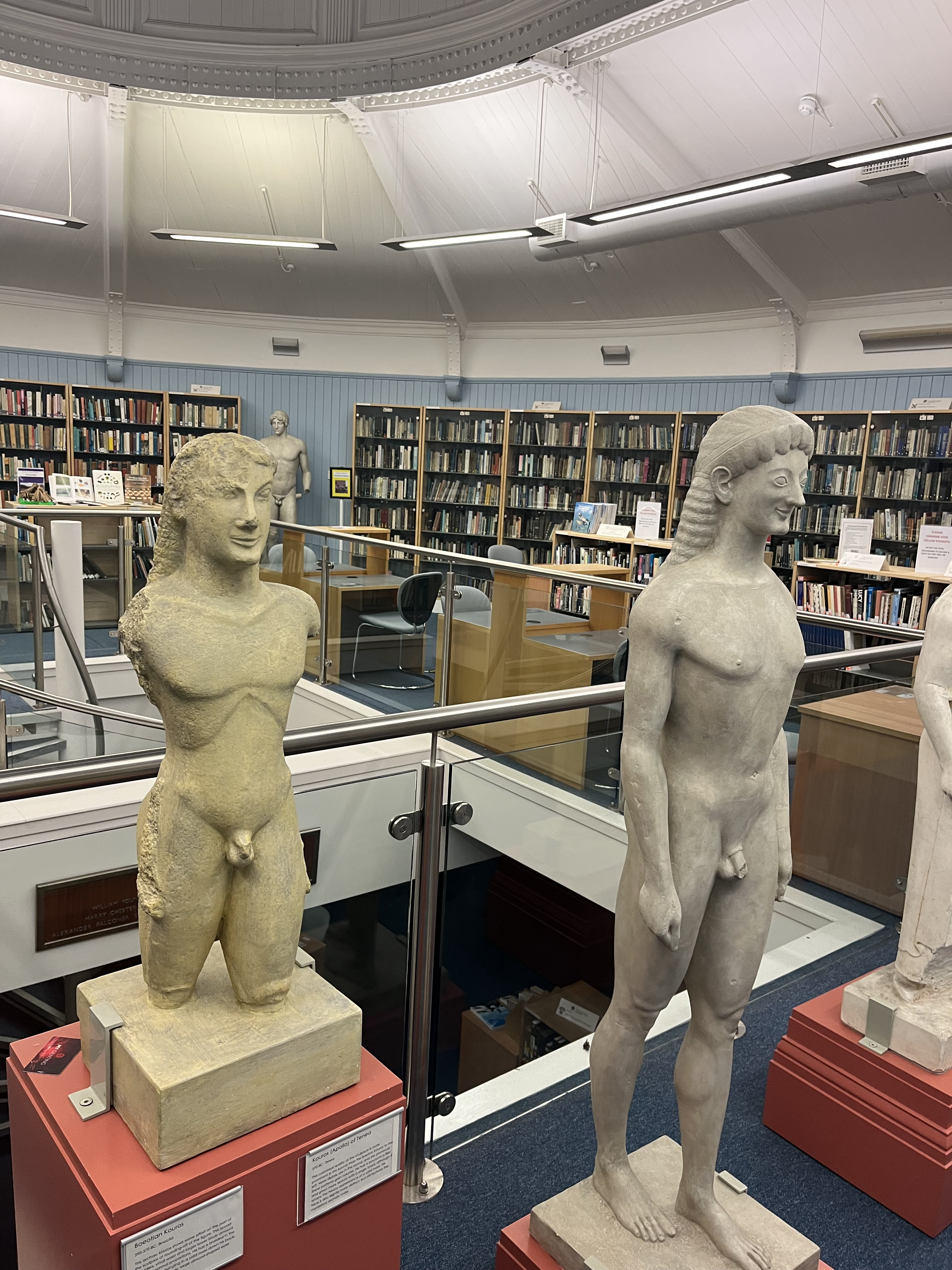
The Sellar and Goodhart Library

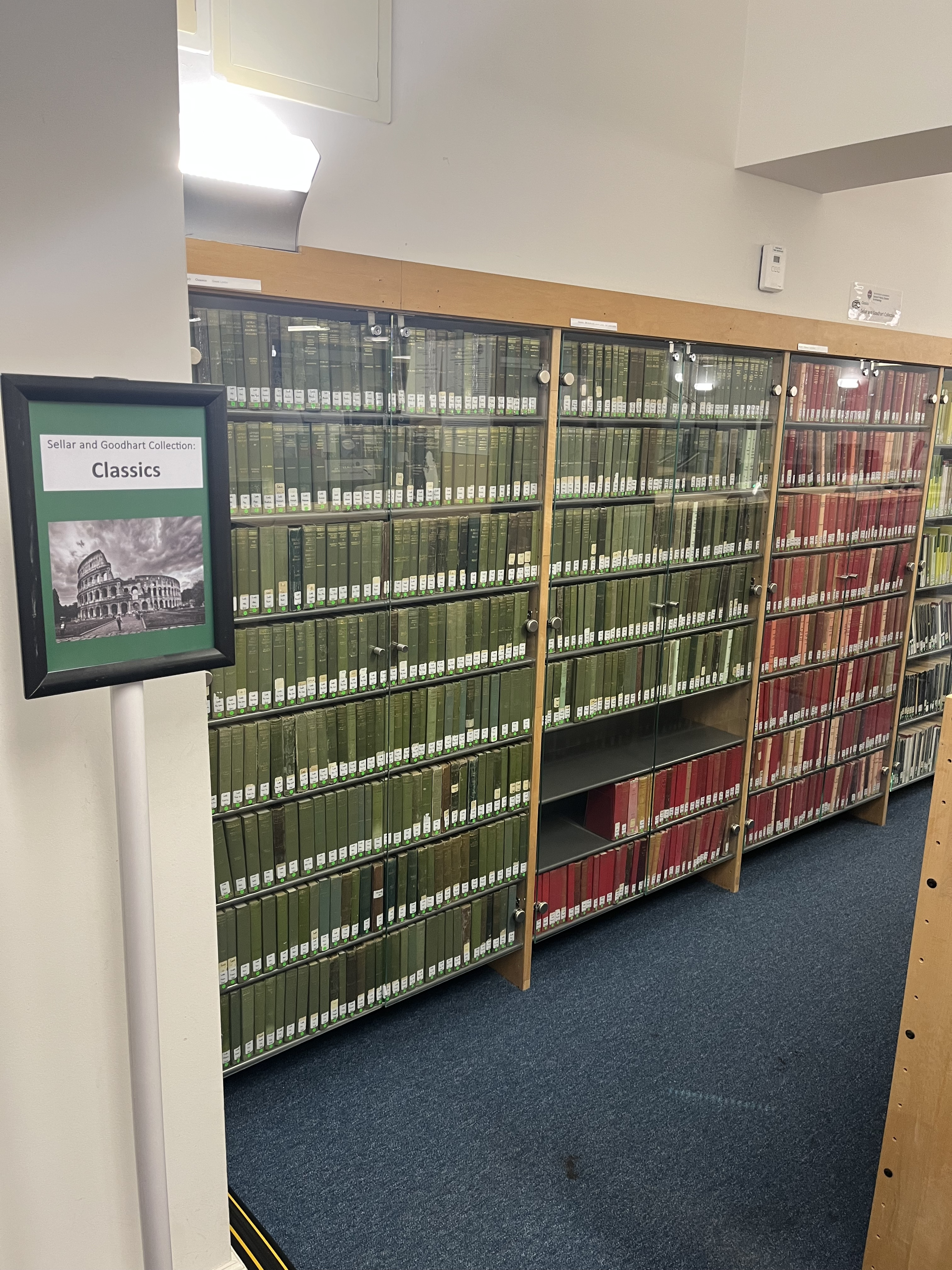

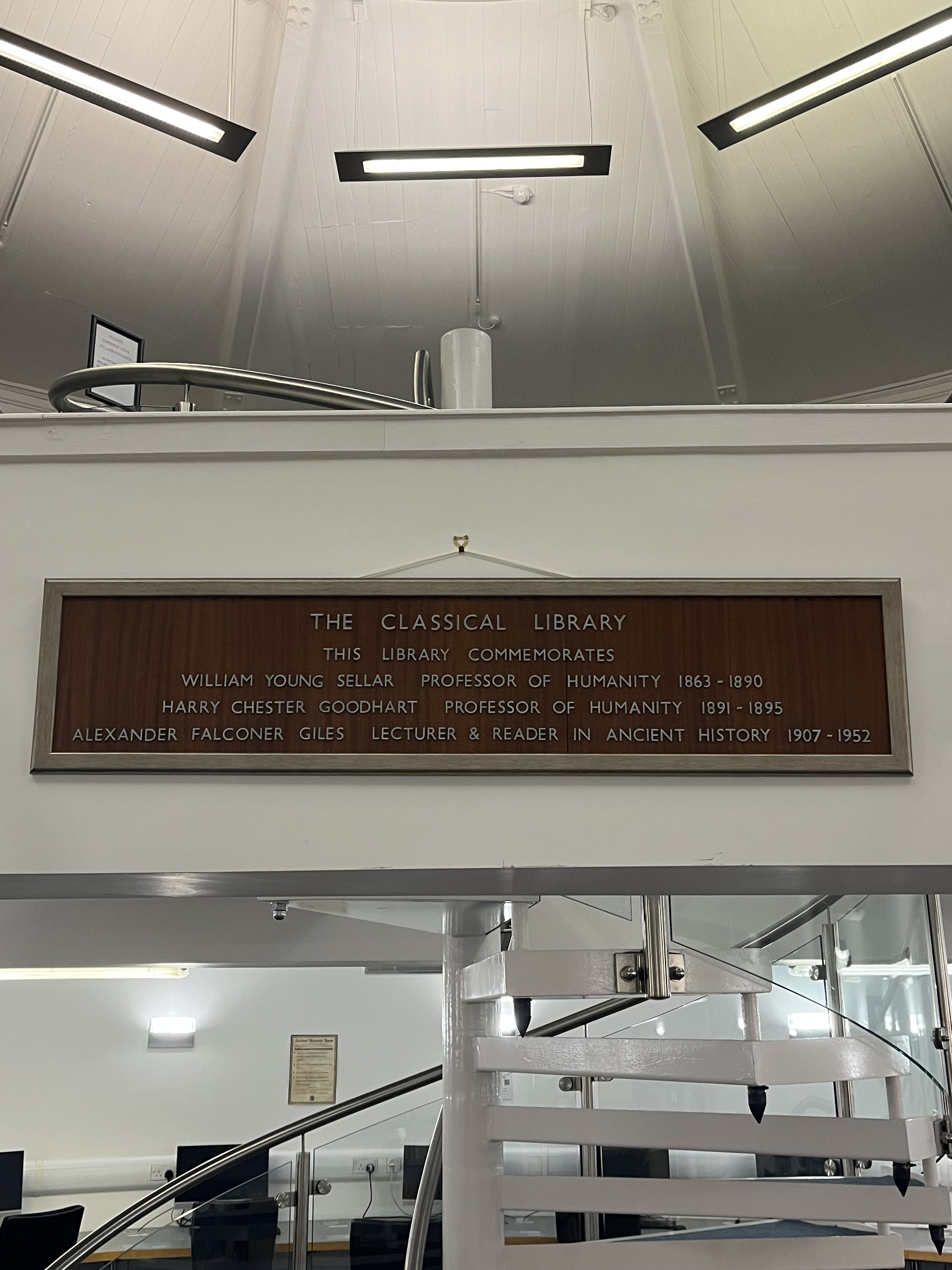

== List of Professors of Humanity from 1708 to 1982 ==
- 1708–1734: Laurence Dundas
- 1728–1734: Adam Watt (shared the Chair with Dundas and predeceased him)
- 1734–1741: John Ker
- 1741–1775: George Stuart
- 1775–1805: John Hill
- 1806–1820: Alexander Christison
- 1820–1863: James Pillans
- 1863–1890: William Young Sellar
- 1890–1895: Harry Chester Goodhart
- 1895–1916: William Ross Hardie
- 1916–1919: Chair vacant
- 1919–1948: Oliffe Legh Richmond
- 1948–1959: Michael Grant
- 1959–1982: Ian M. Campbell

== List of Professors of Greek from 1708 to 1981 ==
- 1708–1729: Willam Scott Primus
- 1729–1730: William Scott Secundus
- 1730–1753: Colin Drummond (shared the Chair with Law from 1738 and with Hunter from 1741)
- 1738–1741: Robert Law
- 1741–1772: Robert Hunter
- 1772–1805: Andrew Dalzell
- 1805–1851: George Dunbar
- 1852–1882: John Stuart Blackie
- 1882–1903: Samuel H. Butcher
- 1902–1928: Alexander Wiliam Mair
- 1928–1930: Sir Arthur Wallace Pickard-Cambridge
- 1930–1951: Sir William Moir Calder
- 1951–1981: Arthur James Beattie

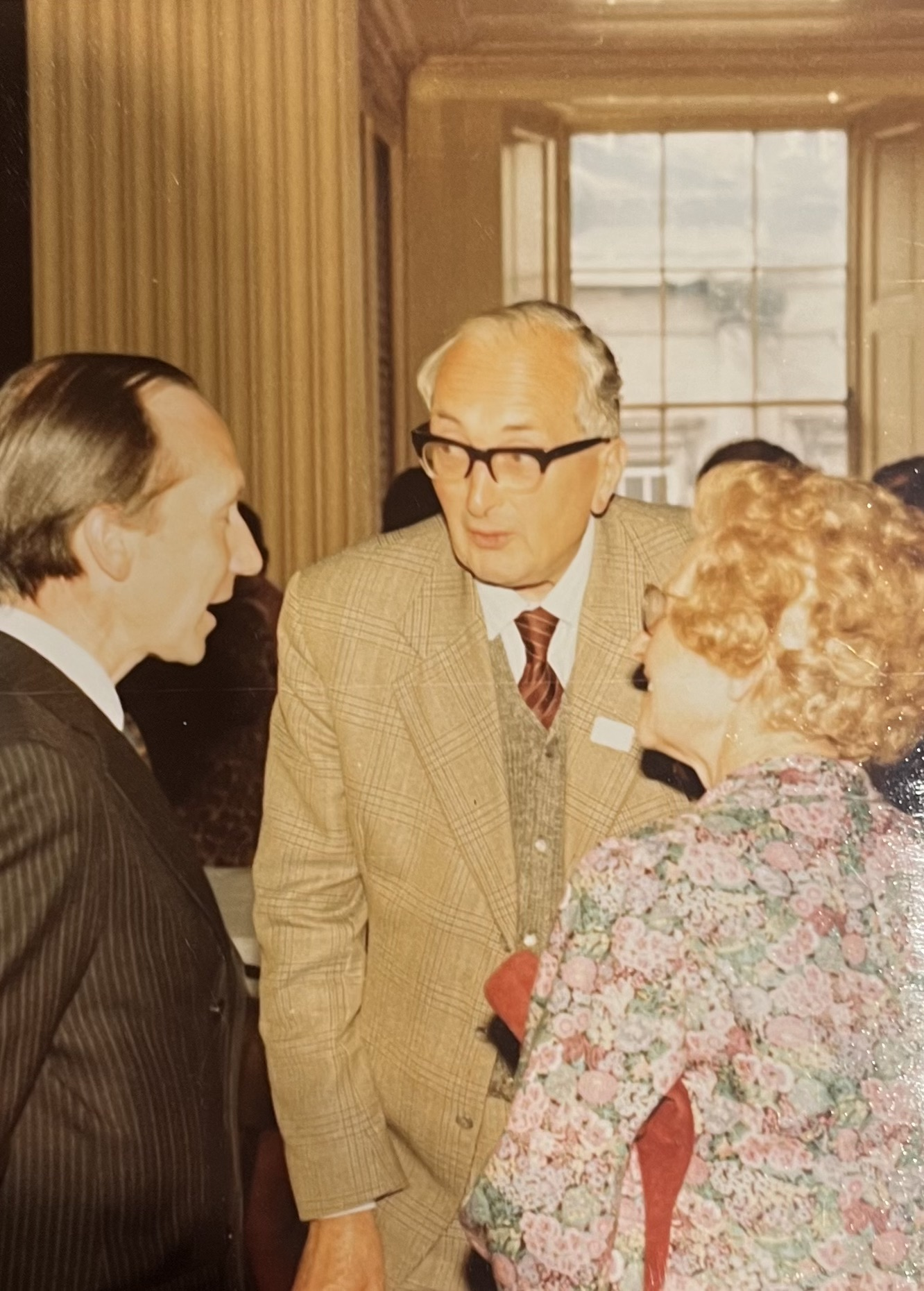
Ian M. Campbell, final Professor of Humanity 1959-1982.

Colin Drummond (brother of Adam Drummond) was first appointed as a Regent of Philosophy in 1707, and then to the Chair of Logic and Metaphysics in 1708 where he taught David Hume, before he took up the Chair of Greek in 1730. Robert Hunter sold the Chair to Dalzell for £300 'and a liferent of the salary' as sanctioned by the Town Council, since without pensions the aging professors often only had their Chairs as assets in old age.

In 1983, E. K. Borthwick was appointed to a personal chair in Greek at Edinburgh, but this is not to be confused with the established Chair.

== List of Professors of Classics since 1987 ==
- 1987–2002: John Richardson
- 2004–Present: Douglas Cairns

== See also ==
- Regius Professor of Greek (Oxford)
- Regius Professor of Greek (Cambridge)
- MacDowell Professor of Greek (Glasgow)
- Professor of Humanity (Glasgow)
- Regius Professor of Humanity (Aberdeen)
- Professor of Greek (University College London)
- Professor of Latin (University College London)
