= James Bailey (classical scholar) =

English classical scholar and schoolmaster

James Bailey (died 1864) was an English classical scholar and schoolmaster.

== Life ==
He was educated at Trinity College, Cambridge. He graduated B.A. 1814, M.A. 1823, and obtained the Browne medals for Greek ode and epigrams, and the members' prizes in 1815 and 1816. He was for many years master of the Perse Grammar School, Cambridge, from which he retired on a pension.

In 1850 he received a further pension of £100 per annum from the queen, on the recommendation of Bishops Edward Maltby and John Kaye. Bailey died in London, 13 February 1864.

== Works ==
Besides contributions to the Classical Journal, Bailey published:

- 'An Annotated Edition of Dalzel's Analecta Græca Minora (1835) (edition of work by Andrew Dalzell).
- 'Passages from the Greek Comic Poets,' which had been translated into English by Richard Cumberland, Francis Fawkes, and Francis Wrangham, with notes (1840);
- a work on the 'Origin and Nature of Hieroglyphics and the Greek inscription on the Rosetta Stone' (1816).

He is best known for his edition of 'Forcellini's Latin Dictionary,' 2 vols. (1826), in which he translated the Italian explanations into English, incorporated the appendices of Egidio Forcellini with the main work, and added an Auctarium of his own.

== Notes ==
Attribution

This article incorporates text from a publication now in the public domain: "Bailey, James". Dictionary of National Biography. London: Smith, Elder & Co. 1885–1900.
