= W. Sidney Allen =

English linguist (1918–2004)

William Sidney Allen FBA
- Photograph of Allen c.1982, from his obituary in the Proceedings of the British Academy
- Born: 18 March 1918; London
- Died: 22 April 2004 (aged 86); Cambridge
- Occupation: Academic
- Spouses: Aenea McCallum (m. 1955; died 1996) Diana Stroud (m. 2002)

Academic background
- Education: Trinity College, Cambridge
- Thesis: Linguistic problems and their treatment in antiquity (1948)
- Doctoral advisor: A. J. Beattie

Academic work
- Discipline: Classical Philology, Linguistics
- Sub-discipline: Historical linguistics, Sanskrit, Indo-European phonology.
- Institutions: School of Oriental & African Studies, London, Trinity College, Cambridge
- Notable works: Vox Latina (1965); Vox Graeca (1968)

William Sidney Allen, FBA (18 March 1918 – 22 April 2004), was a British linguist and philologist, best known for his work on Indo-European phonology.

== Early life and undergraduate education ==
Allen was born in north London, the elder son of William Percy Allen, a maintenance engineer in a printing works, and Ethel Pierce, the daughter of a compositor. From childhood, he was primarily known as 'Sidney', to avoid confusion with his father.

After a year at private school, Allen was educated at a local council school before attending Christ's Hospital on a scholarship. On the advice of his form master, Derrick Macnutt (a fellow Classicist, better known as the crossword compiler 'Ximenes'), he sat the entrance exam to read Classics at Trinity College, Cambridge in 1937, and was awarded a major scholarship. As an undergraduate at Trinity, his teachers included Harold Walter Bailey, professor of Sanskrit, and N. B. Jopson, later president of the Philological Society.

== Military service ==
The Second World War broke out in September 1939, just a month before the start of what would have been Allen's final year at Cambridge. At the time, Allen and two college friends were on an expedition to Iceland, investigating the Icelandic language, and only barely managed to return to Cambridge in time for the beginning of term.

As a member of the Officers' Training Corps, he was called up in October 1939, and commissioned in May 1940 into the Royal Tank Regiment. On the strength of his brief experience of Iceland and its language, he was posted to the island, now occupied by British forces, as an intelligence officer and winter warfare instructor. In the spring of 1942, he was placed in command of a photographic unit of the Intelligence Corps, involved in planning the Allied invasion of Normandy. From shortly after D-Day in 1944 until the armistice of 1945, he served with the British 2nd Army, including the Battle of the Bulge.

While awaiting demobilisation in 1945, Allen was tasked with organising the escort of sixteen German generals, including Hasso von Manteuffel, to London to be interrogated.

== Academic career ==
Rather than studying for the third and final year (Part II) of the Classical Tripos, Allen opted to take a 'War BA' and begin doctoral study in 1945, under the philologist A. J. Beattie. He submitted his Ph.D. thesis in 1948 under the title ‘Linguistic problems and their treatment in antiquity’, examined by John Brough of the School of Oriental & African Studies and Peter Noble of the University of Aberdeen.

Shortly after submitting his Ph.D., Allen was appointed lecturer in Phonetics at SOAS, a position he held until 1951, when he requested that it be converted into a lectureship in Comparative Linguistics, under which name he held it until 1955. Throughout 1952, he conducted fieldwork in Rajasthan into the dialects of the Rajasthani languages, hoping to find data of use in reconstructing Proto-Indo-European phonology, and also conducted important work into the structure of the Caucasian language Abaza, later described as 'epoch-making'. A close co-worker during his time at SOAS was R. H. Robins, a noted disciple of John Rupert Firth.

From 1955 until his retirement in 1982, Allen held the position of Professor of Comparative Philology at the University of Cambridge, where he worked closely with John Chadwick. He was a fellow of Trinity College from 1955 until his death. He was elected a Fellow of the British Academy in 1971.

In 1969, along with Michael Black of Cambridge University Press, Allen founded the Cambridge Studies in Linguistics series of monographs. He was chairman of its editorial board until his retirement from Cambridge in 1982.

He was influential in the development of several important figures in British linguistics, including George Hewitt, John Lyons, John C. Wells, and Geoffrey Horrocks, who held Allen's former Cambridge position as Professor of Comparative Philology. He was also influential in developing linguistics as a distinct discipline in 20th-century Britain, lobbying the General Board of the University of Cambridge to set up linguistics positions in the 1960s, and in helping to found the section for linguistics (subsequently renamed 'Linguistics and Philology') at the British Academy in 1985. The University of Cambridge has a prize named after him, awarded for distinguished performance by a linguistics undergraduate.

== Personal life ==
During his time at SOAS, Allen met Aenea McCallum, the editorial secretary of the School’s journal, the Bulletin of the School of Oriental & African Studies, who had previously studied English and Modern Languages at the University of Aberdeen and served in counterintelligence during the Second World War. The two were married from 1955 until Aenea's death in 1996.

In 1995, Allen underwent a hip replacement, after which he required at-home care; after Aenea's death, he met Diana Stroud, one of his part-time carers. The two married in 2002. He had no children.

Allen's younger brother, David (born 1927), was a local government officer with the Greater London Council.

== Selected works ==
- Phonetics in Ancient India (1953)
- On the Linguistic Study of Languages (inaugural lecture) (1957)
- Sandhi (1962)
- Vox Latina (1965, 2nd edition 1978)
- Vox Graeca (1968, 3rd edition 1987)
- Accent and Rhythm (1973)

== Bibliography ==
- Brown, E.K.; Law, Vivien (2002). Linguistics in Britain: Personal Histories. Oxford: Blackwell.
- Lyons, Sir John (2006). "William Sidney Allen: 1918-2004" (PDF). Proceedings of the British Academy. 138: 3–36.
