= John Stuart Blackie =

Scottish scholar and man of letters (1809–1895)

John Stuart Blackie FRSE
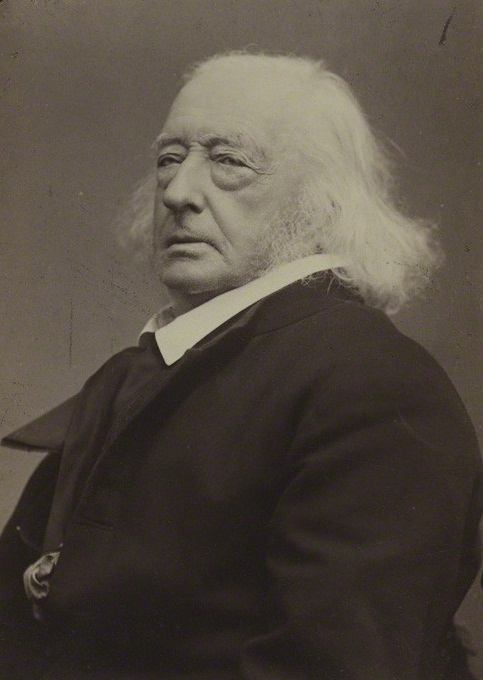
- John Stuart Blackie, by Elliott & Fry, Albumen Cabinet Card, 1870s.
- Born: 28 July 1809; Glasgow, Lanarkshire, Scotland
- Died: 2 March 1895 (aged 85); Edinburgh, Scotland
- Occupations: scholar, intellectual

Signature
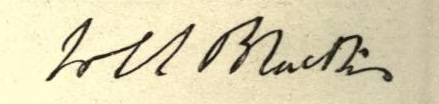

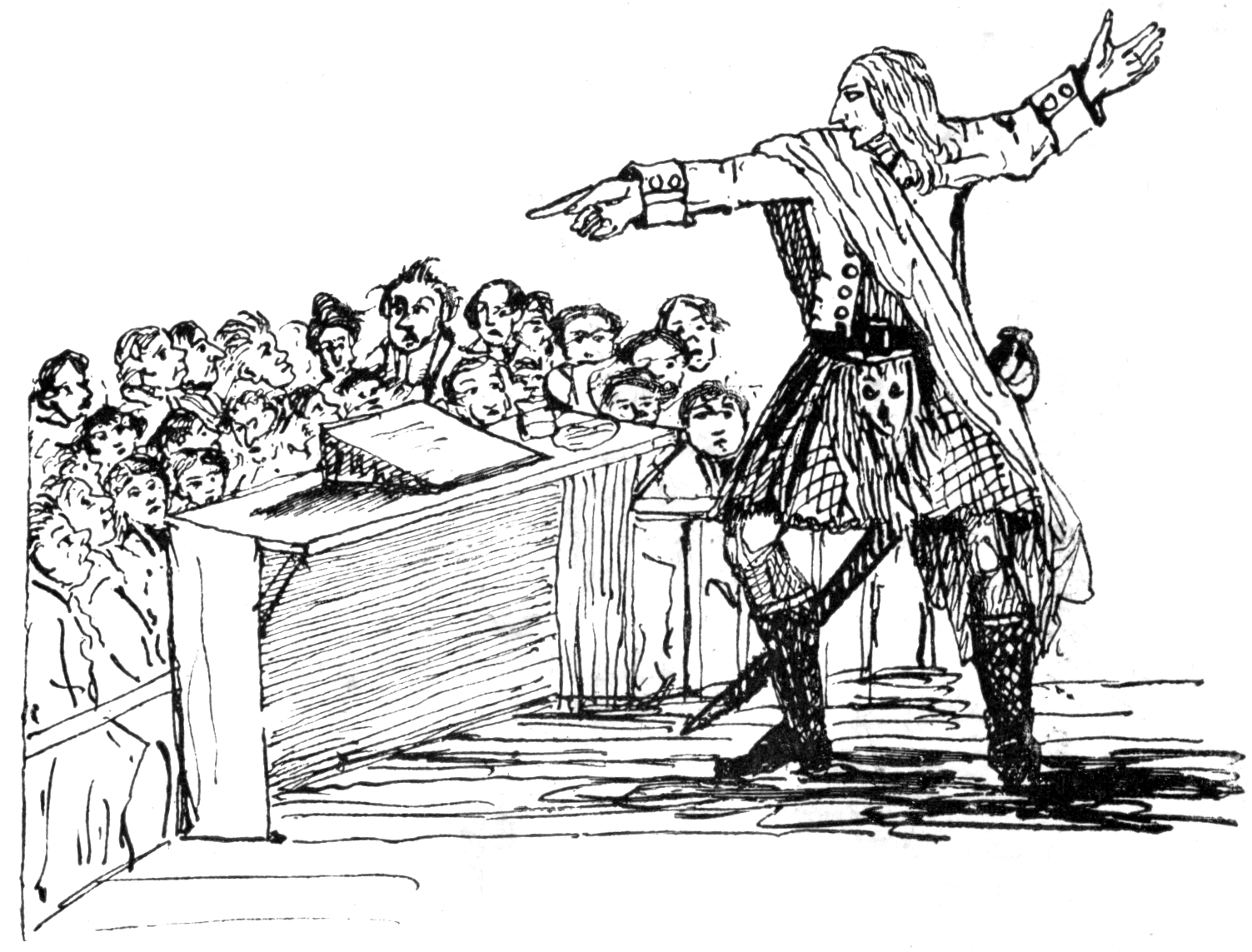
Caricature of Blackie before the Greek class in The Strand.

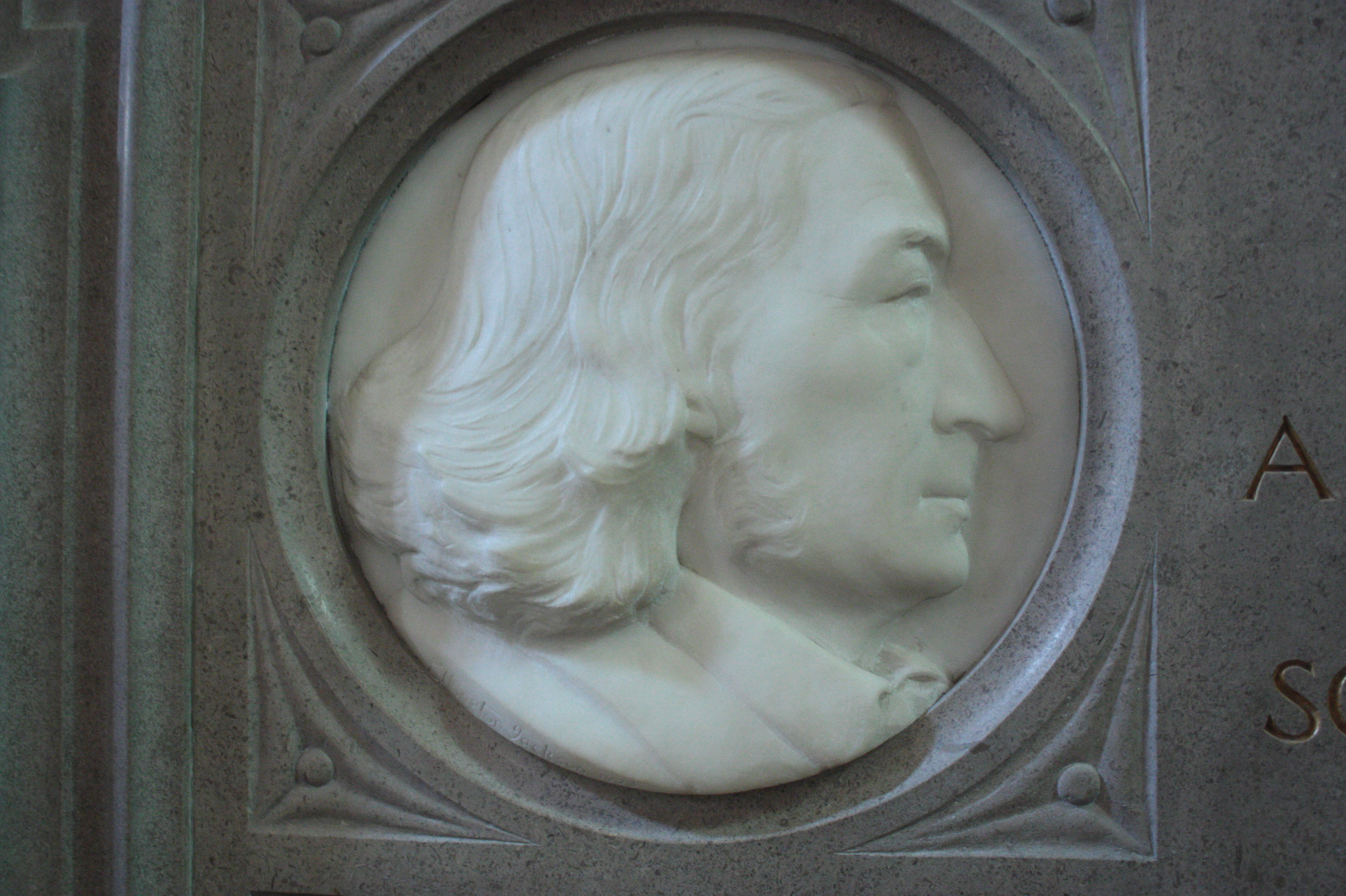
memorial to John Stuart Blackie in St Giles Cathedral, Edinburgh

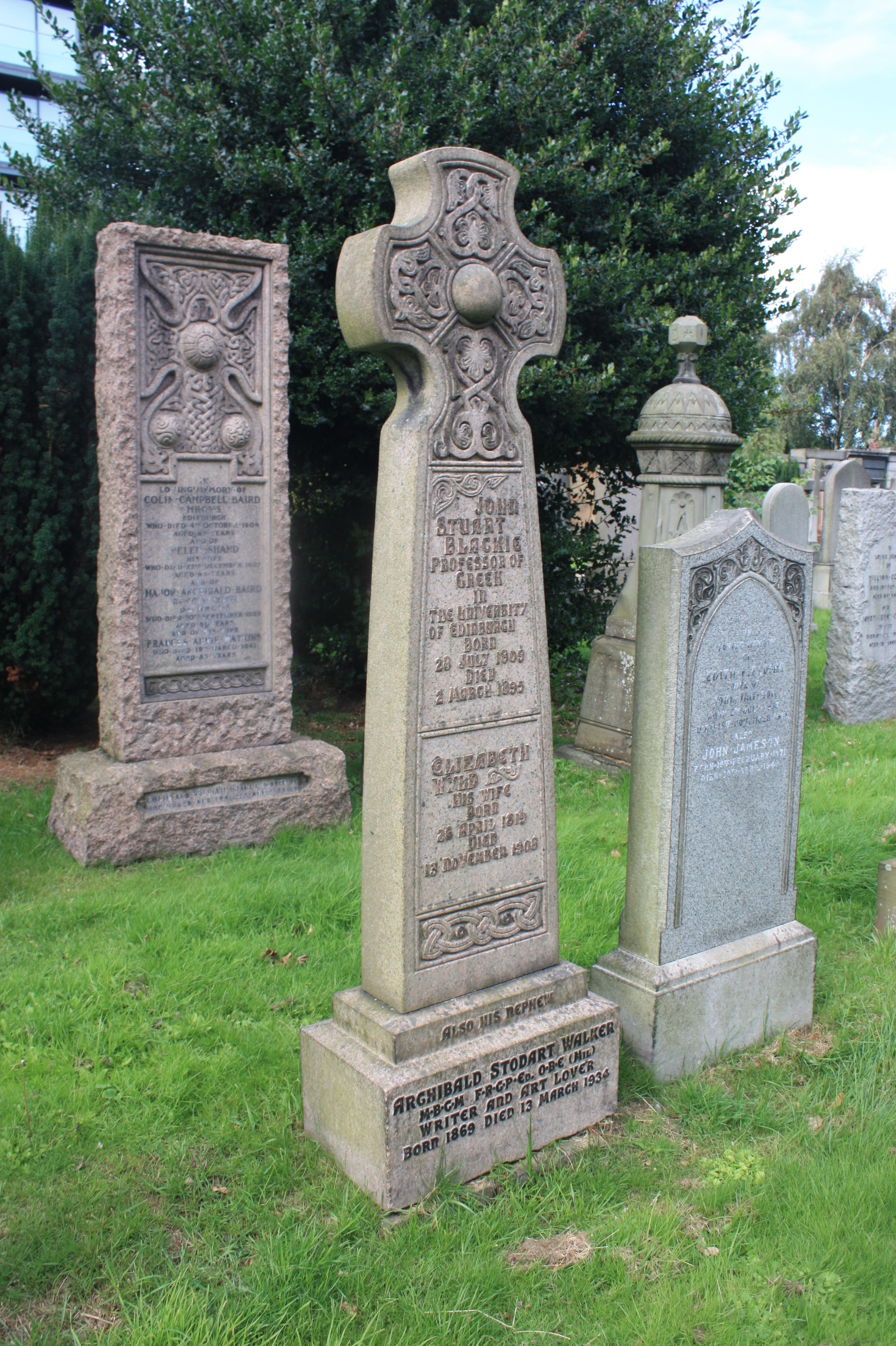
John Stuart Blackie's grave, Dean Cemetery

John Stuart Blackie FRSE (28 July 1809 – 2 March 1895) was a Scottish classical scholar and man of letters. He served as Professor of Humanity at the University of Aberdeen from 1839 to 1852, and then as Professor of Greek at the University of Edinburgh from 1852 to 1882.

== Biography ==
He was born in Glasgow, on Charlotte Street, the son of Kelso-born banker Alexander Blackie (d.1846) and Helen Stodart. He was educated at the New Academy and afterwards at the Marischal College, in Aberdeen, where his father was manager of the Commercial Bank.

After attending classes at Edinburgh University (1825–1826), Blackie spent three years at Aberdeen as a student of theology. In 1829, he went to Germany, and after studying at Göttingen and Berlin (where he came under the influence of Heeren, Müller, Schleiermacher, Neander and Böckh) he accompanied Bunsen to Italy and Rome. The years spent abroad extinguished his former wish to enter the Church, and at his father's desire he gave himself up to the study of law.

He had already, in 1824, been placed in a lawyer's office, but only remained there six months. By the time he was admitted a member of the Faculty of Advocates (1834) he had acquired a strong love of the classics and a taste for letters in general. A translation of Goethe's Faust, which he published in 1834, met with considerable success, winning the approbation of Carlyle. After a year or two of desultory literary work he was (May 1839) appointed to the newly instituted Chair of Humanity (Latin) in the Marischal College.

Difficulties arose in the way of his installation, owing to the action of the Presbytery on his refusing to sign unreservedly the Confession of Faith; but these were eventually overcome, and he took up his duties as professor in November 1841. In the following year he married. From the first his professorial lectures were conspicuous for the unconventional enthusiasm with which he endeavoured to revivify the study of the classics; and his growing reputation, added to the attention excited by a translation of Aeschylus which he published in 1850, led to his appointment in 1852 to the Professorship of Greek at Edinburgh University, in succession to George Dunbar, a post which he continued to hold for thirty years.

He was somewhat erratic in his methods, but his lectures were a triumph of influential personality. A journey to Greece in 1853 prompted his essay On the Living Language of the Greeks, a favorite theme of his, especially in his later years; he adopted for himself a modern Greek pronunciation, and before his death he endowed a travelling scholarship to enable students to learn Greek at Athens.

During J. S. Blackie's tenure of the Greek Chair, he taught Robert Louis Stevenson, and Stevenson would later write:

'Although I am the holder of a certificate of attendance in the Professor's own hand, I cannot remember to have been present in the Greek class above a dozen time. Professor Blackie was even kind enough to remark (more than once) while in the very act of writing the document above referred to, that he did not know my face.'

Scottish nationality was another source of enthusiasm with him; and in this connection he displayed real sympathy with highland home life and the grievances of the crofters. The foundation of the Celtic chair at Edinburgh University was mainly due to his efforts. He raised almost all £12,000 needed for it. In spite of the many calls upon his time he produced a considerable amount of literary work, usually on classical or Scottish subjects, including some poems and songs of no mean order.

Blackie was a Radical and Scottish nationalist in politics, of an independent type; possessed of conversational powers and general versatility, his eccentricity made him one of the characters of the Edinburgh of the day, and a well-known figure as he went about in his plaid, worn shepherd-wise, over one shoulder and under the other, wearing a broad-brimmed hat, and carrying a big stick. He was made the first chairman of the Scottish Home Rule Association.

In the 1880s and 1890s, he lectured at Oxford on the pronunciation of Greek, and corresponded on the subject with William Hardie. In May 1893, he gave his last lecture at Oxford, but afterwards admitted defeat, stating: "It is utterly in vain here to talk reasonably in the matter of Latin or Greek pronunciation: they are case-hardened in ignorance, prejudice and pedantry".

He died at 9 Douglas Crescent in Edinburgh. His death caused great mourning in the city. He is buried in Dean Cemetery to the north side of the central path in the north section of the original cemetery. His nephew and biographer, Archibald Stodart Walker (1869-1934) is buried with him.

Before his death John Blackie gave more than 250 volumes of 19th-century Greek books on various subjects to the University of Edinburgh library.

In 1895, a plaque, designed by Robert Lorimer was erected to his memory in St Giles Cathedral.

== Publications ==
All printed by David Douglas.

- Lyrical Poems (1860)
- Lays of the Highlands and Islands (1872)
- Horae Hellenicae (1874)
- On Self-Culture, Intellectual, Physical, and Moral (1874)
- The Wise Men of Greece (1877)
- The Wisdom of Goethe (1883)
- A Song of Heroes (1890)

== Family ==
Blackie married Elizabeth (known as Eliza) Wyld in 1842. They had no children. She is buried with him.

He was the uncle of Sir Alexander Kennedy.

== Gallery ==
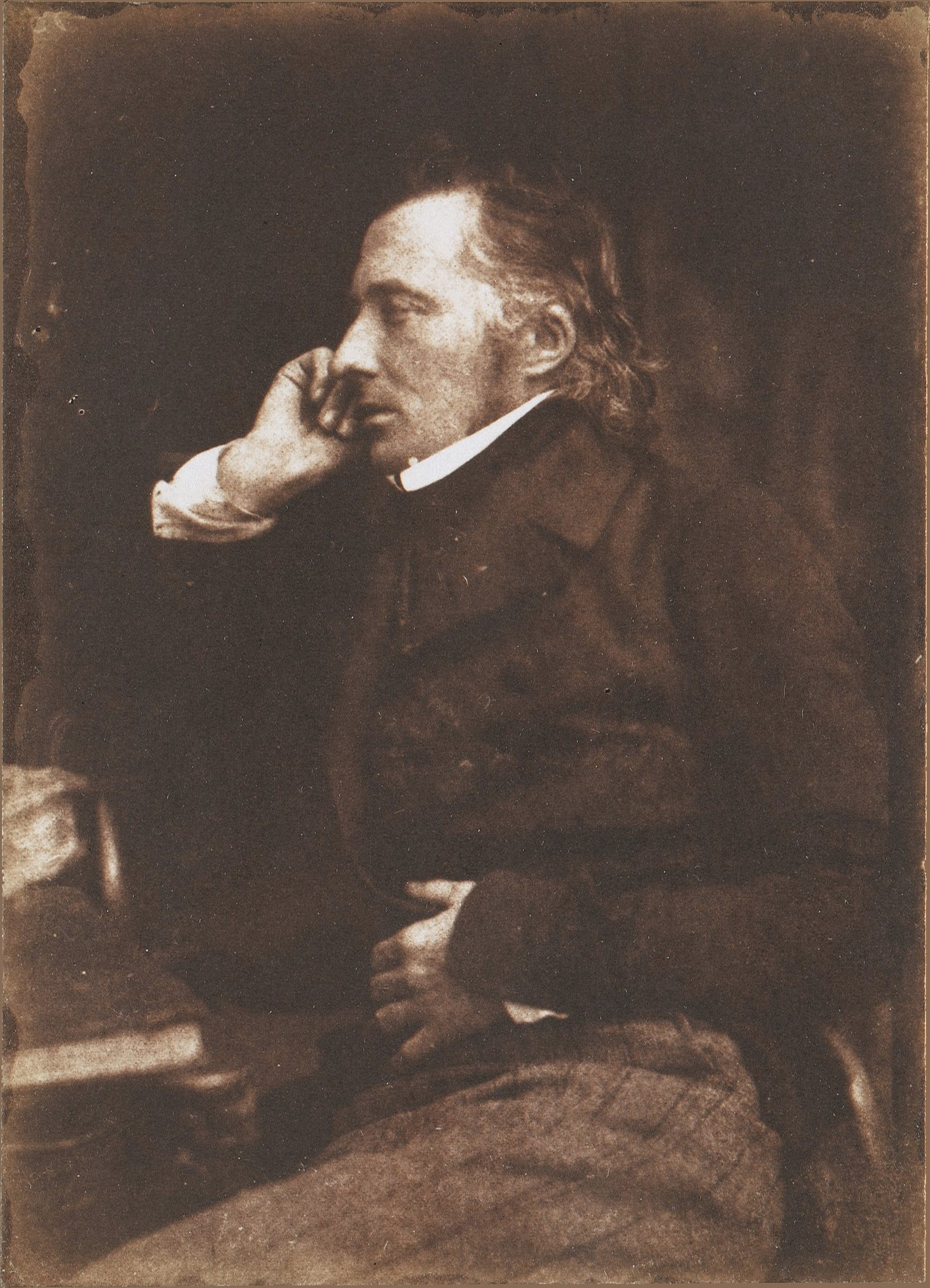
Blackie circa 1845 by Hill & Adamson.

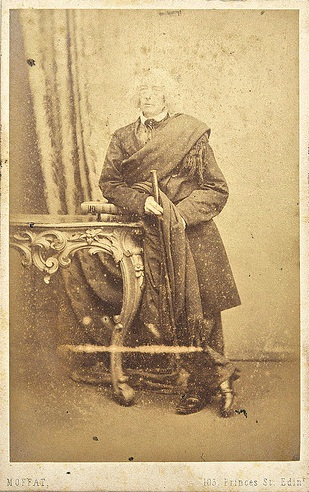
Prof. Blackie, by John Moffat.

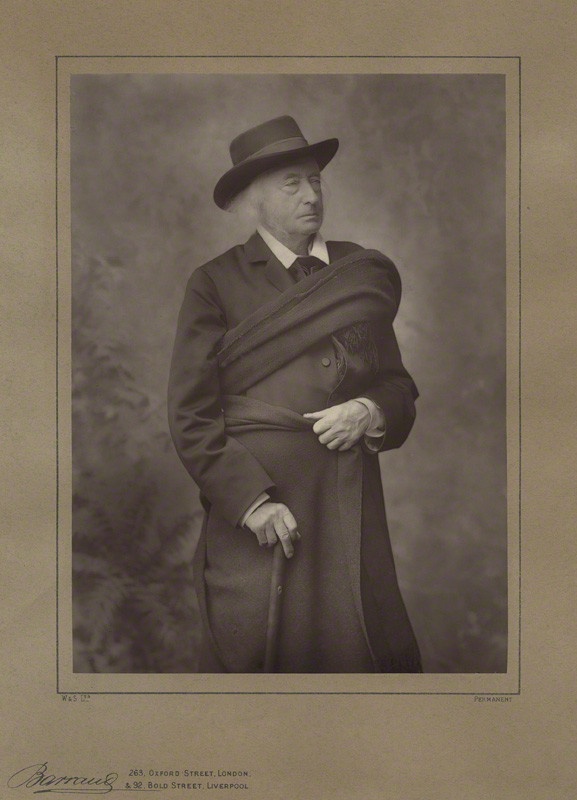
John Stuart Blackie, by Herbert Rose Barraud, Carbon Print, 1890.

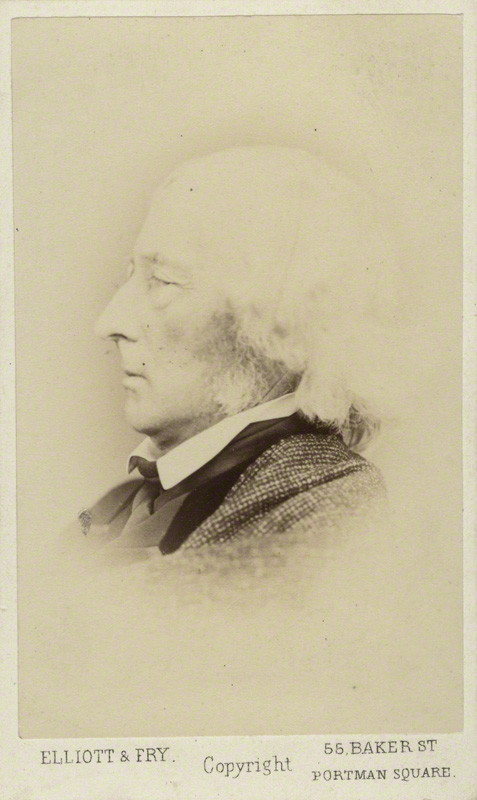
John Stuart Blackie, by Elliott & Fry, Albumen Carte-de-visite, 1860s.

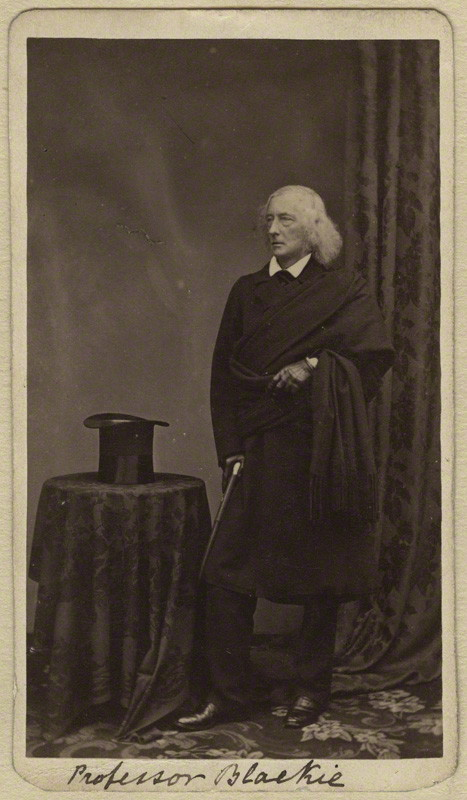
John Stuart Blackie, by John Moffat, Albumen Carte-de-visite on Paper Mount, 1860s.

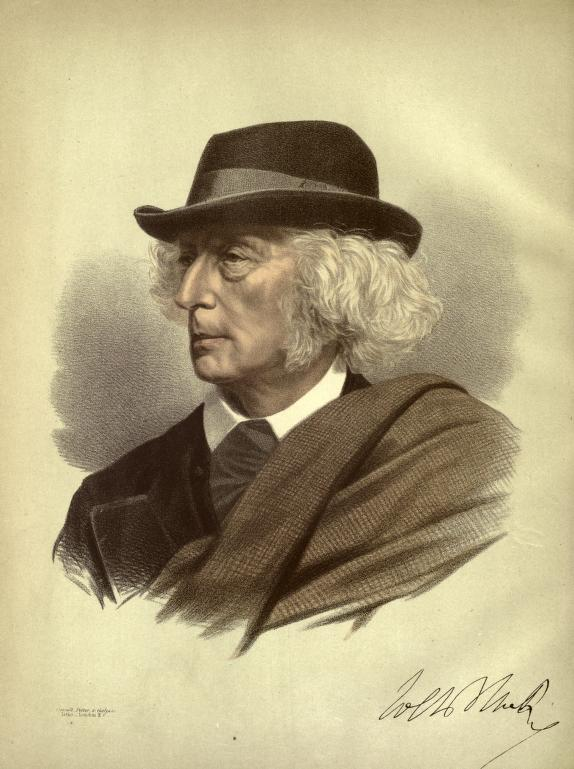
Portrait of John Blackie, Cassell's National Portrait Gallery, circa 1880s.

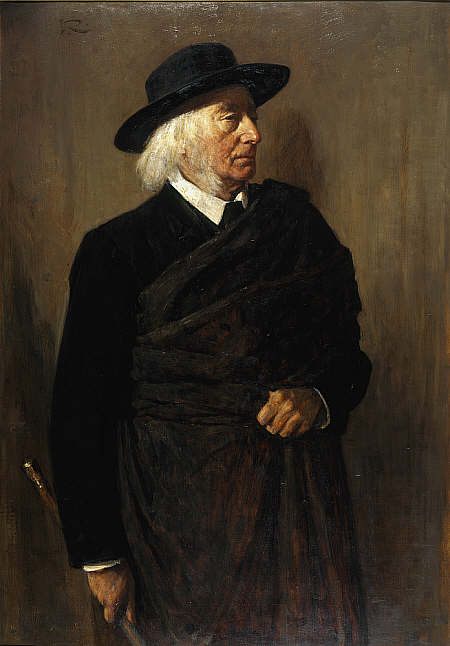
Professor John Stuart Blackie, by Sir George Reid, 1893.

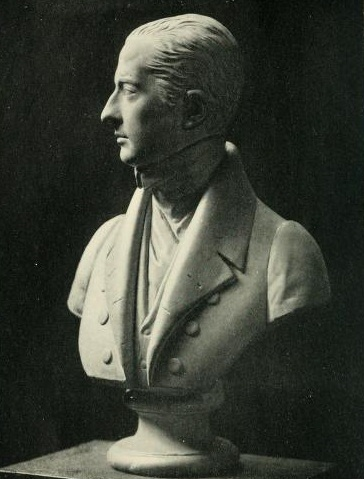
Bust of John Stuart Blackie, in 1835.

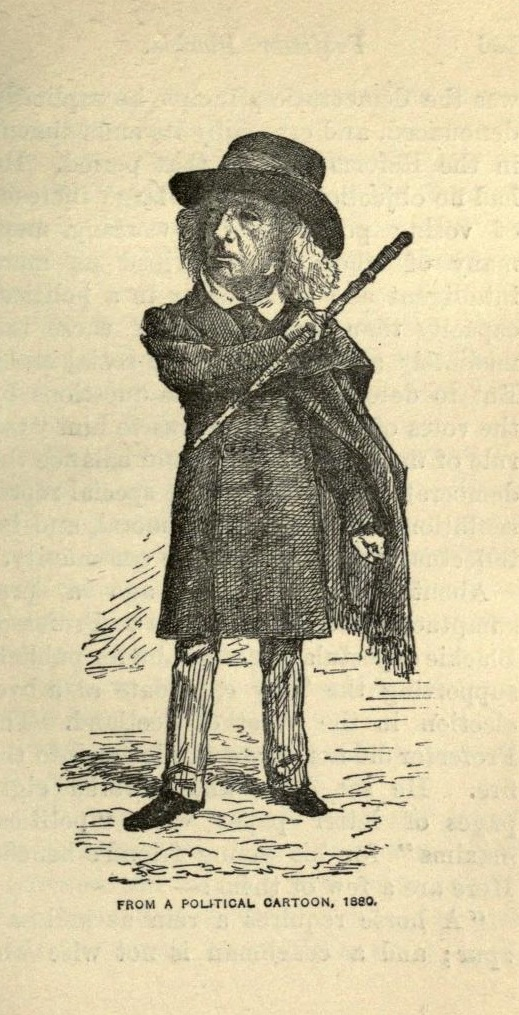
"From a Political Cartoon, 1880."

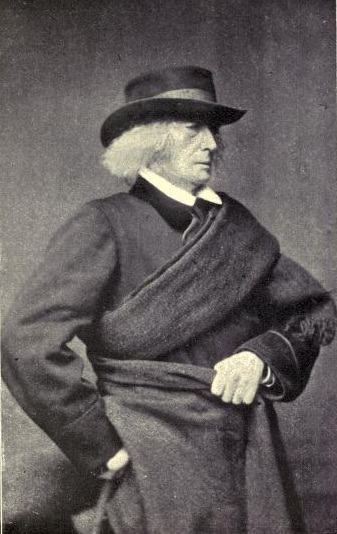
Professor Blackie, by Macara, 1877.

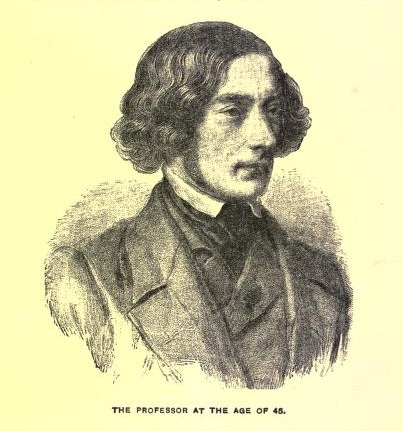
"The Professor at the Age of 45."

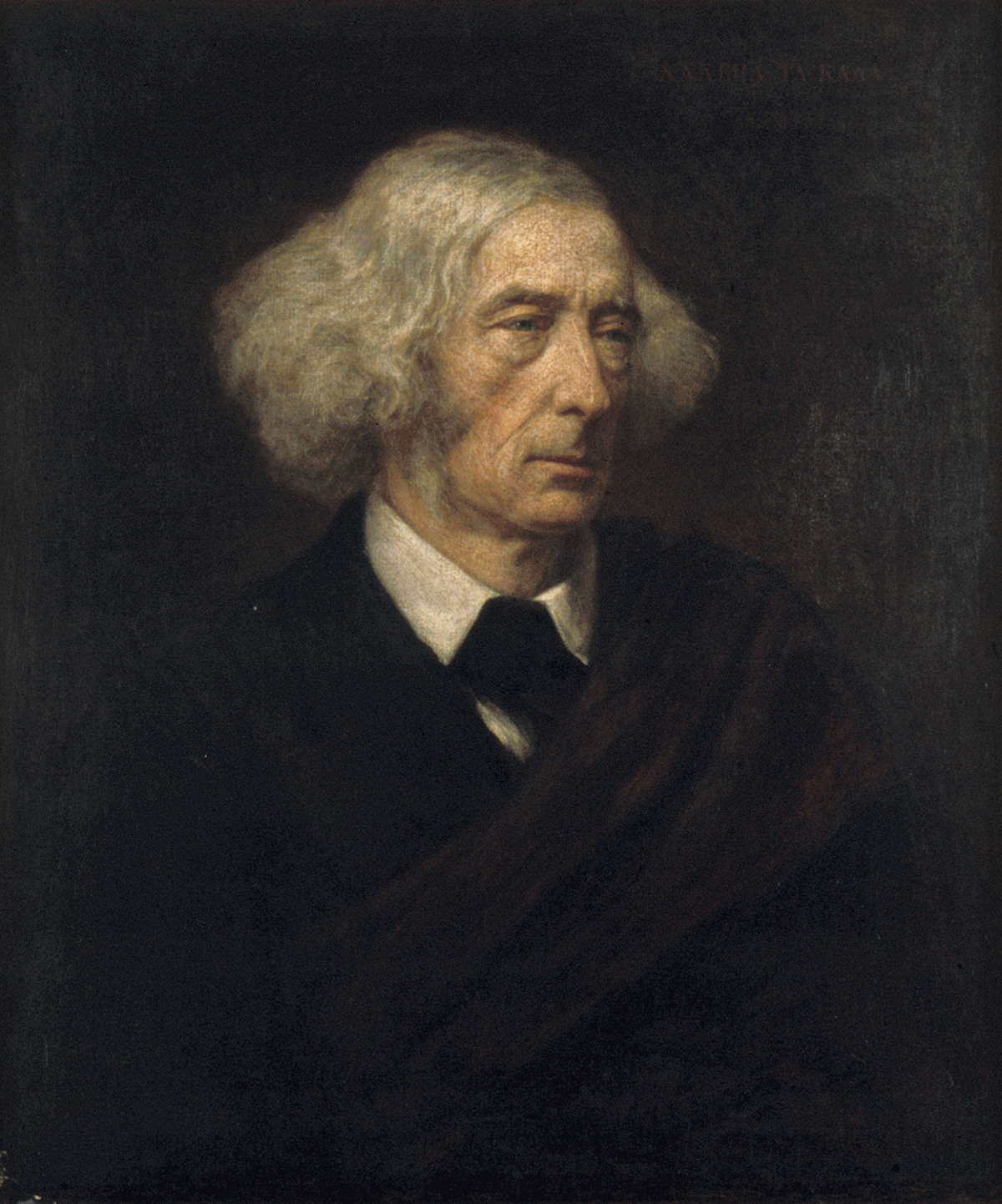
Blackie, by Sir George Reid, 1870.

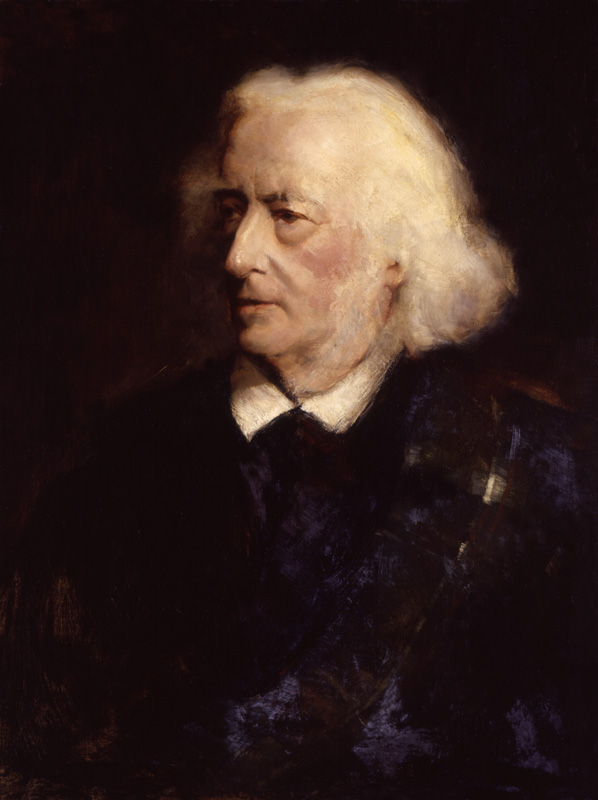
John Blackie, by Somerled Macdonald.

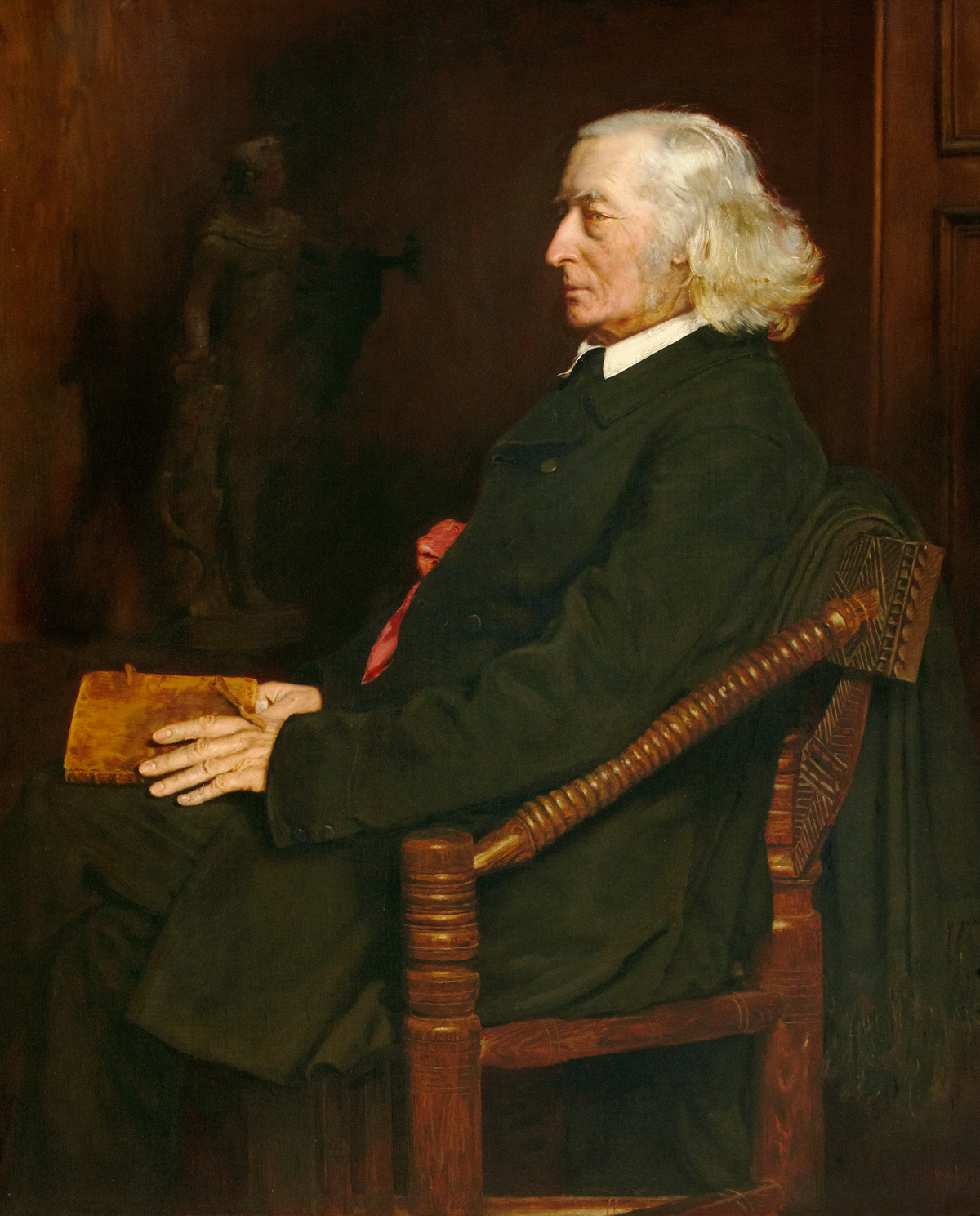
Blackie, by John Henry Lorimer.

== Works ==
The hymn he wrote on his honeymoon, "Angels holy, high and lowly," has been called his most enduring work.

- Education in Scotland: An Appeal to the Scottish People, on the Improvement of their Scholastic and Academical Institutions, W. Tait, 1846.
- The Pronunciation of Greek: Accent and Quantity, a Philological Inquiry, Sutherland & Knox, 1852.
- Classical Literature in its Relation to the Nineteenth Century and Scottish University Education, Sutherland and Knox, 1852.
- On Beauty: Three Discourses Delivered in the University of Edinburgh, Sutherland and Knox, 1858.
- Homer and the Iliad, Vol. 1 Vol. 2, Vol. 3, Vol. 4, Edmonston & Douglas, 1866 [maintaining the unity of the poems. For further information, see the section on Blackie in English translations of Homer].
- War Songs of the Germans, Edmonston and Douglas, 1870.
- Four Phases of Morals: Socrates, Aristotle, Christianity, Utilitarianism, Edmonston and Douglas, 1871.
- On Self-Culture, Edmonston & Douglas, 1874 [particularly recommended by James Wood].
- Horae Hellenicæ, Essays and Discussion on Some Important Points of Greek Philology and Antiquity, Macmillan & Co., 1874.
- Four Phases of Morals: Socrates, Aristotle, Christianity, Utilitarianism, Edmonston and Douglas, 1874.
- The Language and Literature of the Scottish Highlands, Edmonston and Douglas, 1876.
- Songs of Religion and Life, Scribner, Armstrong & Co., 1876.
- The Natural History of Atheism, Scribner, Armstrong & Company, 1878 [1st Pub. 1877].
- The Wise Men of Greece, Macmillan and Company, 1877.
- Lays and Legends of Ancient Greece, William Blackwood & Sons, 1880.
- Faust: A Tragedy, Macmillan & Co., 1880 [second ed.].
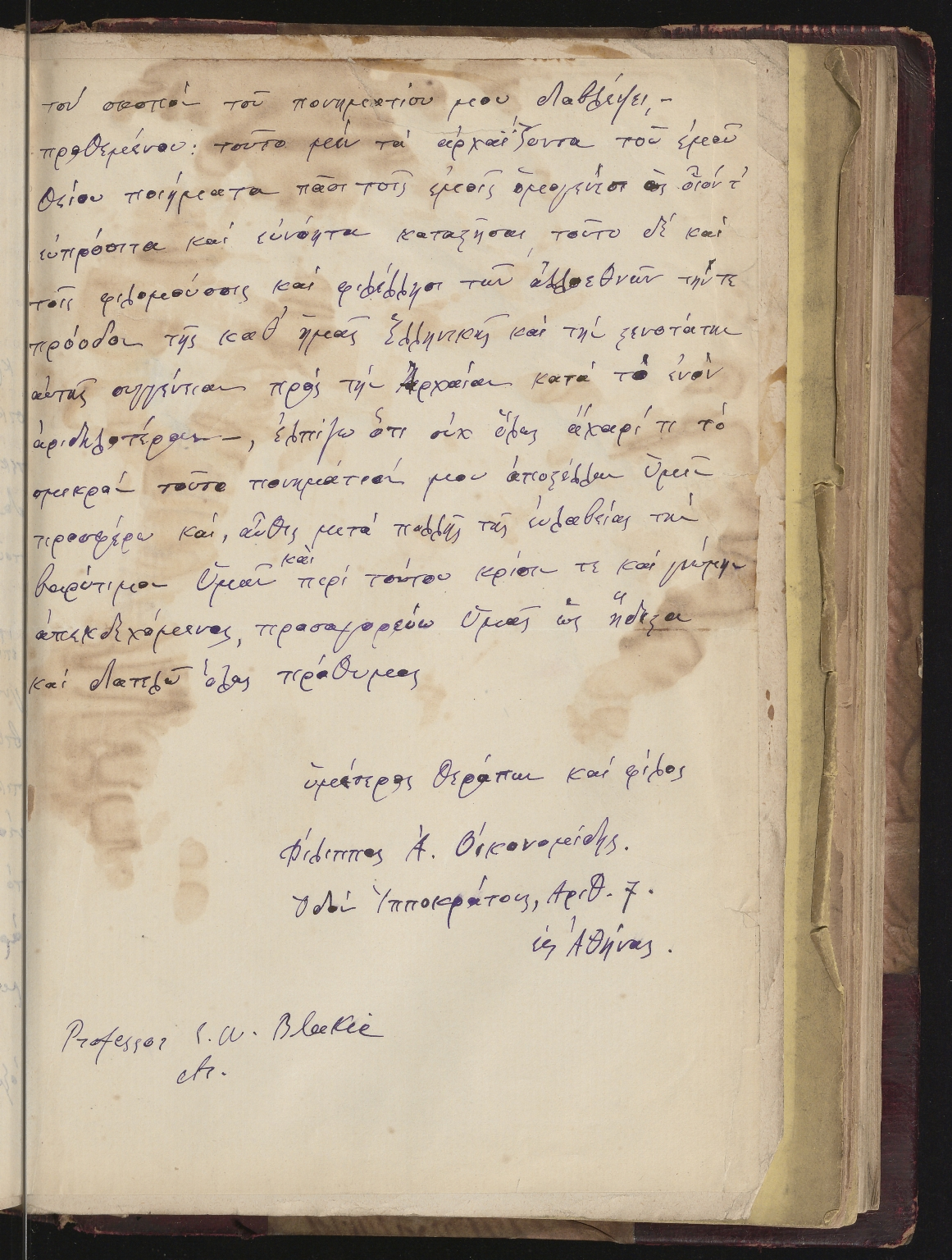
- Letter written by John Stuart Blackie on a book of Greek poems. 1894.
  Lay Sermons Charles Scribner's Sons, 1881.
- Altavona; Fact and Fiction From my Life in the Highlands, D. Douglas, 1882.
- The Wisdom of Goethe, William Blackwood & Sons, 1883.
- The Scottish Highlanders and the Land Laws, Chapman and Hall, 1885.
- What does History Teach?: Two Edinburgh Lectures, Macmillan and Co., 1886.
- Life of Robert Burns, Walter Scott, 1888.
- Scottish Song: its Wealth, Wisdom, and Social Significance, W. Blackwood and Sons, 1889.
- A Song of Heroes, William Blackwood & Sons, 1890.
- Essays on Subjects of Moral and Social Interest, David Douglas, 1890.
- Christianity and the Ideal of Humanity, David Douglas, 1893.
- The Selected Poems of John Stuart Blackie. Edited by Archibald Stodart Walker. 1896.
- The Letters of John Stuart Blackie to His Wife, with a Few Earlier Ones to His Parents. Edited by Archibald Stodart Walker. 1910.
- Greek and English dialogues, for use in schools, 1871.
- Greek Primer, Colloquial & Constructive, 1891.
- Messis Vitae: Gleanings of Song from a Happy Life. 1886.
- The Lyrical Dramas of Æschylus, Translated Into English Verse by John Stuart Blackie, Two Volumes. 1850.

Amongst his political writings, may be mentioned:

- On Democracy, Edmonston & Douglas, 1867.
- The Constitutional Association on Forms of Government: A Historical Review and Estimate of the Growth of the Principal Types of Political Organism in Europe, Edmonston and Douglas, 1867.
- Political Tracts, 1868.

=== Selected articles ===
- "Prussia in the Nineteenth Century," The Contemporary Review, Vol. XXIX, December 1876/May 1877.
- "The Scot," The Contemporary Review, Vol. XXXIII, August 1878.
- "On a Radical Reform in the Method of Teaching the Classical Languages," The Contemporary Review, Vol. XXXIV, 1879.
- "Landlords and Land Laws," The Contemporary Review, Vol. XXXVII, January/June 1880.
- "Problem of the Homeric Poems," The Contemporary Review, Vol. XXXVIII, July/December 1880.
- "The Philosophy of the Beautiful," The Contemporary Review, Vol. XLIII, January/June, 1883.
- "Scotland Today," The Forum, Vol. V, 1888.
- "The Christianity of the Future," The Forum, Vol. X, 1890.
- "Shakespeare and Modern Greek," The Nineteenth Century, Vol. XXX, July/December, 1891.
- "John Knox," The Contemporary Review, Vol. LXII, August 1892.
- "The Method of Teaching Languages," The Contemporary Review, Vol. LXVII, January/June 1895.
- "Modern Greece," The Forum, March 1897.
