= Julia Haig Gaisser =

American classical scholar

Julia Haig Gaisser (born 1941) is an American classical scholar. She is Eugenia Chase Guild Professor Emeritus of the Humanities and Professor of Latin at Bryn Mawr College, Pennsylvania. She specializes in Latin poetry and its reception by Renaissance humanists.

== Career ==
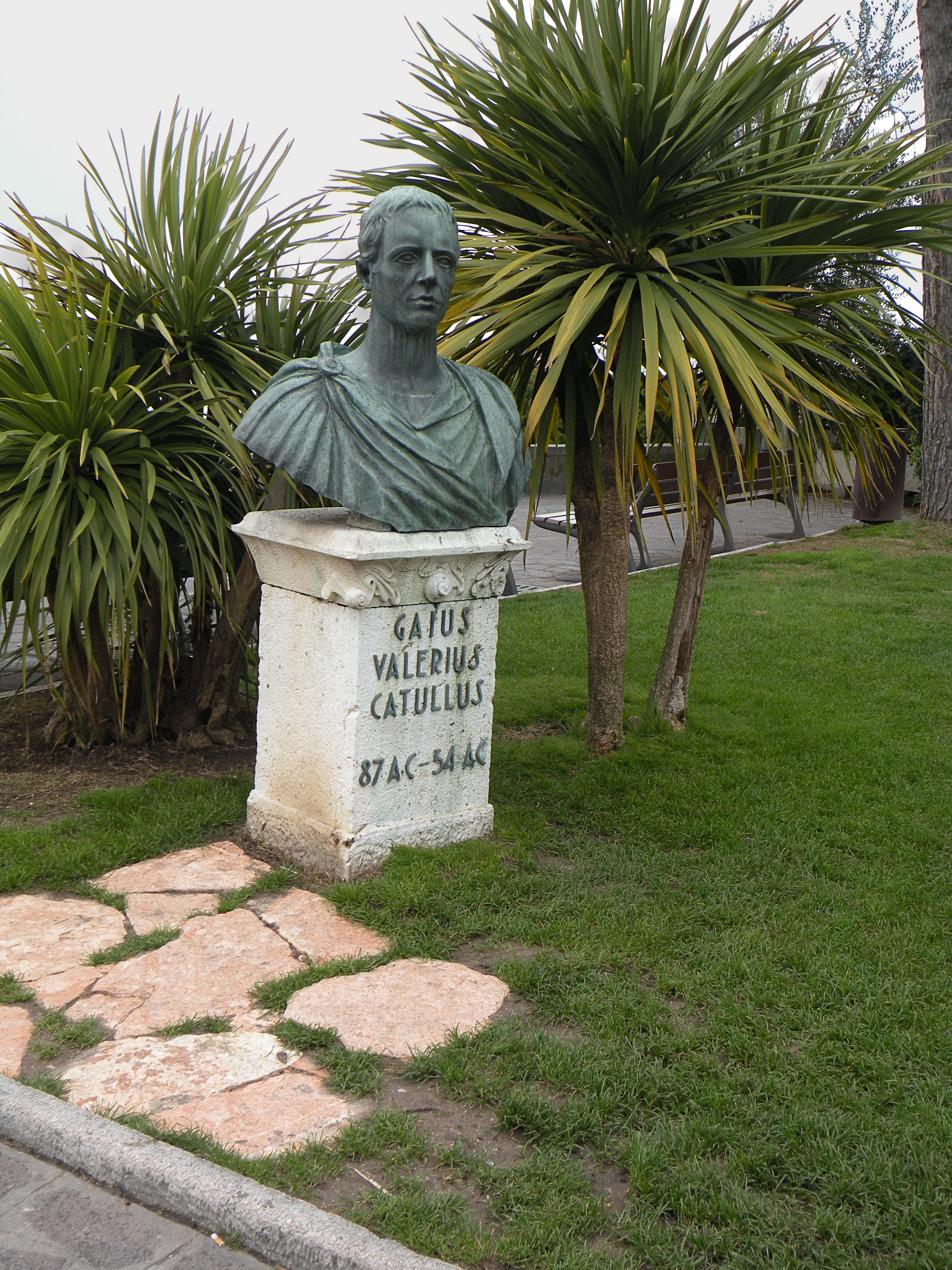
Catullus in Sirmione

Being awarded a scholarship by the Marshall Aid Commemoration Commission of London, Julia Haig Gaisser studied at the University of Edinburgh where she obtained her PhD under the supervision of Prof. Arthur James Beattie, presenting the thesis "A structural analysis of the digressions in the Iliad and the Odyssey". She has taught graduate courses on Republican and Augustan poetry at Bryn Mawr until 2006, when she retired to pursue her research full time. That same year, she was elected to the American Philosophical Society. She has written on Catullus, Renaissance manuscripts and commentaries, and the social life of Renaissance humanists. She is working on the translation of the dialogues of Giovanni Pontano for the I Tatti Renaissance Library.

== Scholarship ==
Julia Haig Gaisser published six books on classical subjects and various chapters and journal articles. In her first book, Catullus and his Renaissance Readers (1993), she studied several genres of Renaissance reception – text criticism, university lecturing, commentaries, and literary imitation and parody. It has been reviewed as "a scholarly and yet eminently readable book, a worthy complement to Catullan studies, shedding light on the historical world of the humanists, and how their reading of Catullus would influence that of later generations". Her edition in English of a little known sixteenth-century dialogue, De Litteratorum Infelicitate by Pierio Valeriano, (Pierio Valeriano on the ill fortune of learned men: a Renaissance humanist and his world), (1999) has been praised "as a work where a slight primary text has become the basis of a useful and most attractive edition, a book which deserves to be very widely read".

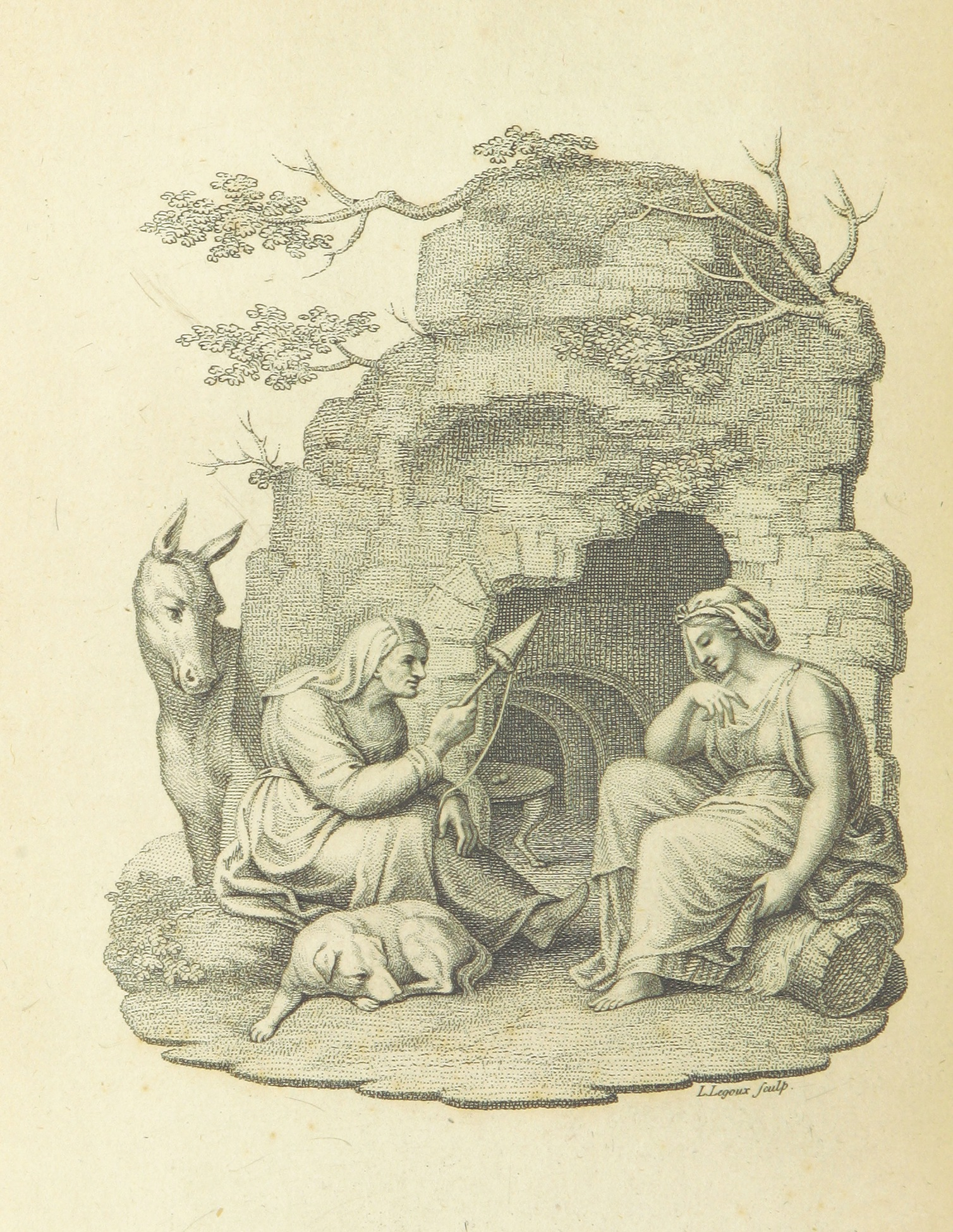
Cupid & Psyche. A tale from the Golden Ass of Apuleius

Catullus in English (2001) is a selection of translations in English that spans over four centuries, arranged by Gaisser in chronological order, and starting in 1614. It has been praised as "encouraging the reader to see Catullus through the eyes of his translators", and "it makes the book a fascinating reading that helps filling the void in accessible literature on the reception of the classics". Oxford Readings in Catullus (2007) is an anthology of twenty-eight papers selected for their "intrinsic interest and importance", accompanied by her own introduction on the main themes of Catullian criticism from 1950 to 2000. Thought-provoking, challenging, it encourages readers to look at Catullus in different ways. It makes a useful resource for undergraduate students while still offering something to the more advanced scholar. For this work Gaisser has been praised as being "a measured, sensible, and good-humored editor and eminently qualified for the task". In her next work, The Fortunes of Apuleius and the Golden Ass: A Study in Transmission and Reception, (2008), she "brings her formidable scholarship to bear in her examination of the work’s reception up to the Renaissance, and it is indeed an intriguing tale. She is at her best in her entertaining treatment of Boccaccio, who owes the larger debt to Apuleius". The journey of the manuscript to codex, print, and eventually in France, Germany, England, is "masterly traced and presented delightfully with an overall feeling of lively intelligence". Catullus, (2009) has been praised as "one of the best book ever to be written on Catullus" and "as a necessary text, aimed at people who like poetry, and at students and scholars, where Gaisser has managed to synthesize all that can be said on Catullus in a concise, clear, simple, direct, didactic and scientific manner". It has been defined as providing "an answer to the need for an undergraduate critical text of the current scholarship in a concise and attractive form", and of being "consistently clear, well informed, and nicely judicious on the many disputed points".

== Selected publications ==
- Catullus and his Renaissance Readers. Oxford University Press, 1993. Reprinted 2001. OCLC 1014955617
- Pierio Valeriano on the Ill-fortune of Learned Men: A Renaissance Humanist and his World. University of Michigan Press, 1999. OCLC 924828603
- Catullus in English. London, Penguin, 2001. OCLC 840919147
- Oxford Readings in Catullus. Oxford University Press, 2007. OCLC 939926537
- The Fortunes of Apuleius and the Golden Ass: A Study in Transmission and Reception. (Martin Classical Lectures). Princeton University Press, 2008. OCLC 476968809
- Catullus. Blackwell Introductions to the Ancient World. Wiley-Blackwell. 2009. OCLC 602274377
- Apuleius in Florence. From Boccaccio to Lorenzo de’Medici. In: Classica et Beneventana: Essays Presented to Virginia Brown on the Occasion of Her 65th Birthday. Turnholt, 2007. 43–70. OCLC 181142216
- The Reception of Classical Texts in the Renaissance. In: The Italian Renaissance in the Twentieth Century. (I Tatti Studies, 2002) 387–400. OCLC 615295070
- Teaching Classics in the Renaissance. Transactions of the American Philological Association. 131 (2001) 1-21. OCLC 4638915881
- Threads in the Labyrinth: Competing Views and Voices in Catullus 64. American Journal of Philology. 116 (1995) 579–616. OCLC 87652712
