= Oliffe Legh Richmond =

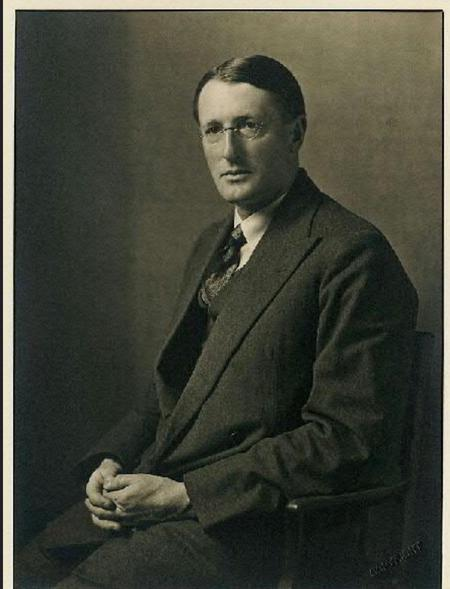
Oliffe Legh Richmond.

Oliffe Legh Richmond (13 September 1881 – 27 May 1977) was a British classical scholar, and Professor of Humanity at Edinburgh University from 1919 to 1948. He was the brother of Bruce Lyttelton Richmond.

== Early life ==
Richmond was educated at Fonthill School and Eton College, before going up to King's College, Cambridge, matriculating in 1900. He was elected a Fellow at King's in 1905, and a College Lecturer in 1909. He held the Craven Studentship for the years 1904-6.

== Military service ==
In the First World War, Richmond was commissioned into the British Army, serving with the Artists' Rifles and as an Intelligence Officer at the War Office and the Italian Headquarters. He finished the war as a Captain.

== Scholarship and career ==
In 1919, Richmond was elected to the vacant Chair of Humanity at the University of Edinburgh, left empty by the death of William Ross Hardie in 1916, but not yet filled owing to the war. His iaugural lecture, delivered on the 14th of October 1919, was entitled 'Classics and the scientific mind'. In 1928 Richmond published his Sexti Properti quae supersunt opera, edidit novoque adparatu critico instruxit with the Cambridge University Press. However, his ingenious theories about the structure of Propertius' elegies and the system of 'Lettercraft', allegedly used by authors to conceal information in their writing, are now generally discredited.

He was succeeded in the Humanity Chair by Michael Grant.

== Personal life ==
Richmond married Beryl Violet Griffith, daughter of Very Rev. Charles Edward Thomas Griffith and Margaret Beatrice Mynors, on 30 December 1919 at Llandaff, Glamorgan, Wales. He later married Edith Ursula Winser, daughter of Charles John Winser and Anne Catherine Cooke Kettle, in December 1934 at London, England. He died on 27 May 1977 at age 95 at 3 Silchester Hall, Silchester Common, Reading.
