= Francis Fawkes =

English poet and translator (1720–1777)

Francis Fawkes (1720–1777) was an English poet and translator. He translated works by Anacreon, Sappho and other classical authors, modernised parts of the poems of Gavin Douglas, and was the author of the well-known song, The Brown Jug, and of two poems, Bramham Park and Partridge Shooting. His translation of the Argonautica in rhymed couplets appeared in 1780.

== Life ==
Fawkes was born near Doncaster, the son of Jeremiah Fawkes, for twenty-eight years rector of Warmsworth, Doncaster. He was baptised at Warmsworth on 4 April 1720. He was educated at Bury Grammar School under the Rev. John Lister. On 16 March 1738 he was admitted as a sizar to Jesus College, Cambridge, where his tutor was the Rev. Richard Oakley. He took his degree of B.A in 1742, and proceeded to an M.A. in 1745.

He was ordained in the Church of England, and took the curacy of Bramham in Yorkshire. He later held the curacy of Croydon, where he came to the notice of Archbishop Thomas Herring, leading to his becoming the vicar of Orpington, Kent. He remained at Orpington until April 1774, when, by the favour of Charles Plumptree, rector of Orpington and patron of the adjacent rectory of Hayes, he was appointed to Hayes with the curacy of Downe. The other piece of clerical patronage which he received was a chaplaincy to the Princess Dowager of Wales.

He died on 26 August 1777, leaving his widow, formerly a Miss Purrier of Leeds, whom he married about 1760, with scanty resources. His library was sold in 1778.

== Works ==
Fawkes was a sort of chaplain to George Fox-Lane, and his first production in literature is said to have been an anonymous poem of 1745 describing the beauties of his house, Bramham Park. An elegy for Herring, 'Aurelius', was printed in 1761 in Fawkes's Original Poems and Translations; it was reprinted in 1763 in the collection Seven Sermons by Archbishop Herring.

Fawkes was considered by his contemporaries to be the best translator since the days of Alexander Pope, and his translation of the works of Anacreon was admired by Samuel Johnson.

His works were:

- A Description of May from Gawin Douglas (modernised), by F. Fawkes, 1752; with a poetic dedication to William Dixon of Loversal, a Yorkshire friend. (Second edition
- A Description of Winter from Gawin Douglas, 1754, modernised in style and dedicated to "the Rev. John Lister, A.M., formerly my preceptor." The Description of May was included among the reprints of the Aungervyle Society.
- Works of Anacreon, Sappho, Bion, Moschus, and Musæus translated into English by a gentleman of Cambridge, 1760. Many of the odes were translated by him during his college days, and in some instances he reprinted the versions of William Broome and other writers; 2nd edit. with his name, 1789. Fawkes's translation was printed in France in 1835 and included in the 'Collections of the British Poets' by Robert Anderson (vol. xiii.) and Alexander Chalmers (vol. xx.), and in the 'Greek and Roman Poets' of Charles Whittingham (vol. xiv.). His version of Bion, Moschus, Sappho, and Musæus was published with translations of Hesiod by Charles Abraham Elton, and of Lycophron by Philip Yorke, Viscount Royston in 1832.
- Original Poems and Translations, 1761. Many of the original pieces were humorous; the translations were chiefly from 'Menander' and from the Latin poems of Christopher Smart.
- The Complete Family Bible, with Notes Theological, Moral, Critical, 1761. To this production, which came out in sixty weekly numbers, he sold his name for money, and there was an edition in 1765 "with notes taken from Fawkes."
- The Poetical Calendar, intended as a supplement to Robert Dodsley's collection; selected by Fawkes and William Woty, 1763, 12 vols. To the twelfth volume of this collection Samuel Johnson contributed a character of William Collins, which later formed the basis of the life of Collins in the Lives of the Poets.
- Poetical Magazine, or the Muses' Monthly Companion, vol. i. 1764. It lasted for six months, January to June 1764. In this undertaking Fawkes was again associated with Woty.
- Partridge-Shooting, an eclogue to the Hon. Charles Yorke, 1764. This piece was suggested by Yorke.
- The Works of Horace in English Verse, by Mr. Duncombe and other hands, to which are added many imitations, 1767, 4 vols. Some of the translations and imitations are by Fawkes.
- The Idylliums of Theocritus, translated by Francis Fawkes, 1767. In this translation he had the assistance of friends, including Zachary Pearce, John Jortin, and Samuel Johnson. It was dedicated to Charles Yorke.
- Apollonius Rhodius translated into English, published after his death in 1780, revised by Henry Meen for Fawkes's widow.

Fawkes's volume of original poems was embodied in the collection by Chalmers (vol. xvi.), some of them were included in John Nichols's collection, viii. 88–93, and several of his translations, chiefly from Menander, were reprinted in part i. of the Comicorum Græcorum Fragmenta selected by James Bailey (1840).

Lord Mahon, later Earl of Stanhope, married Lady Hester Pitt, daughter of William Pitt, 1st Earl of Chatham, whose seat was situated in Fawkes's parish of Hayes, on 19 December 1774, and some lines addressed to the bridegroom by Fawkes on this occasion are printed in the Chatham Correspondence, iv. 373. Great popularity attended his song of The Brown Jug, which began with the words

Dear Tom, this brown jug that now foams with mild ale
Was once Toby Fillpott.

It was introduced by John O'Keeffe into his comic opera The Poor Soldier, which was played at Covent Garden Theatre for the first time on 4 November 1783. It was sung then by John Henry Johnstone, and it was later a favourite piece of Charles Incledon. During the debates on Catholic emancipation the opening lines were quoted in the House of Commons by George Canning to ridicule John Copley: the punning imputation was that a speech by Copley was from a pamphlet of Henry Phillpotts.
