= Neil Walker (legal scholar) =

Neil Walker FRSE
- Born: Neil Craig Walker; 5 July 1960 (age 66)
- Title: Regius Professor of Public Law and the Law of Nature and Nations

Academic background
- Education: University of Strathclyde (LLB, PhD)
- Thesis: Police culture and organisation (1991)
- Website: University of Edinburgh

Neil Craig Walker FRSE (born 5 July 1960) is a Scottish lawyer who is currently the Regius Professor of Public Law and the Law of Nature and Nations at the School of Law of the University of Edinburgh. in 2009 he completed a review for the Scottish Government into the final appellate jurisdiction of the Scottish legal system.

== Early life ==
Neil Walker studied at the School of Law of the University of Strathclyde, graduating with a First class LL.B. in 1981. He taught public law at the University of Edinburgh from 1986 to 1996, obtaining a Ph.D. from the University of Strathclyde's Department of Human Resource Management, entitled Police culture and organisation, in 1991.

== Career ==
In 1996, he was appointed Professor of Legal and Constitutional Theory at the School of Law of the University of Aberdeen, and in 2000 moved to the European University Institute in Florence, where he was Professor of European Law, and served as dean of studies from 2002 to 2005. In 2008, he returned to Edinburgh as Professor of Public Law and the Law of Nature and Nations, succeeding Sir Neil MacCormick. His research interests lie mainly in constitutional theory, as well as the relationship between security, legal order and political community.

He has also held a number of visiting appointments, including as visiting professor in the department of philosophy, University of Tilburg, in 2000; visiting professor of law at Columbia Law School, Columbia University in 2005; Eugene Einaudi Chair of European Studies, Law School of Cornell University in 2007; and distinguished visiting professor of law, University of Toronto Faculty of Law, in 2007.

=== Review of appellate jurisdiction ===
On 15 December 2008, the Scottish Government announced Professor Walker had been appointed to conduct a review of final appellate jurisdiction in the Scottish legal system. Under current arrangements, it is possible to appeal from the Court of Session, Scotland's highest civil court, to the Supreme Court of the United Kingdom, but not from the High Court of Justiciary, which remains the highest criminal court. The review covers both the civil and criminal jurisdictions. Professor Walker completed his report in November 2009.
