= Alexandra Braun (legal scholar) =

Italian legal scholar

Alexandra Braun is an Italian legal scholar based at the University of Edinburgh, where she is Lord President Reid Professor of Law at Edinburgh Law School. She was previously Professor of Comparative Private Law at the University of Oxford.

== Biography ==
Braun graduated from the University of Genoa with a Bachelor of Arts degree and was subsequently awarded a Master of Law degree at the same place. She then completed a doctorate in comparative private law at the University of Trento. She was a supernumerary teaching fellow and Junior Research Fellow at St John's College, Oxford, before taking up a post in 2010 as Fellow at Lady Margaret Hall and a Research Fellow at the University of Oxford's Institute of European and Comparative Law, where she was the deputy director from 2014 to 2017. In 2016, the University of Oxford awarded her the title of Professor of Comparative Private Law. In August 2017, Braun became the Lord President Reid Professor of Law at Edinburgh Law School, University of Edinburgh).

== Works ==
Her published works include:

- (edited with A. Röthel), Passing Wealth on Death: Will-Substitutes in Comparative Perspective (Oxford: Hart Publishing, 2016).
- Giudici e Accademia nell'Esperienza Inglese (Mulino, 2006).
- (edited with M. Dogliotti), Il Trust nel Diritto delle Persone e della Famiglia (Milan: Giuffré, 2003).
- Dalla Disgrazia al Danno (Giuffre Editore Milano, 2002).
