= Arthur James Beattie =

British classical philologist (1914–1996)

Arthur James Beattie FRSE
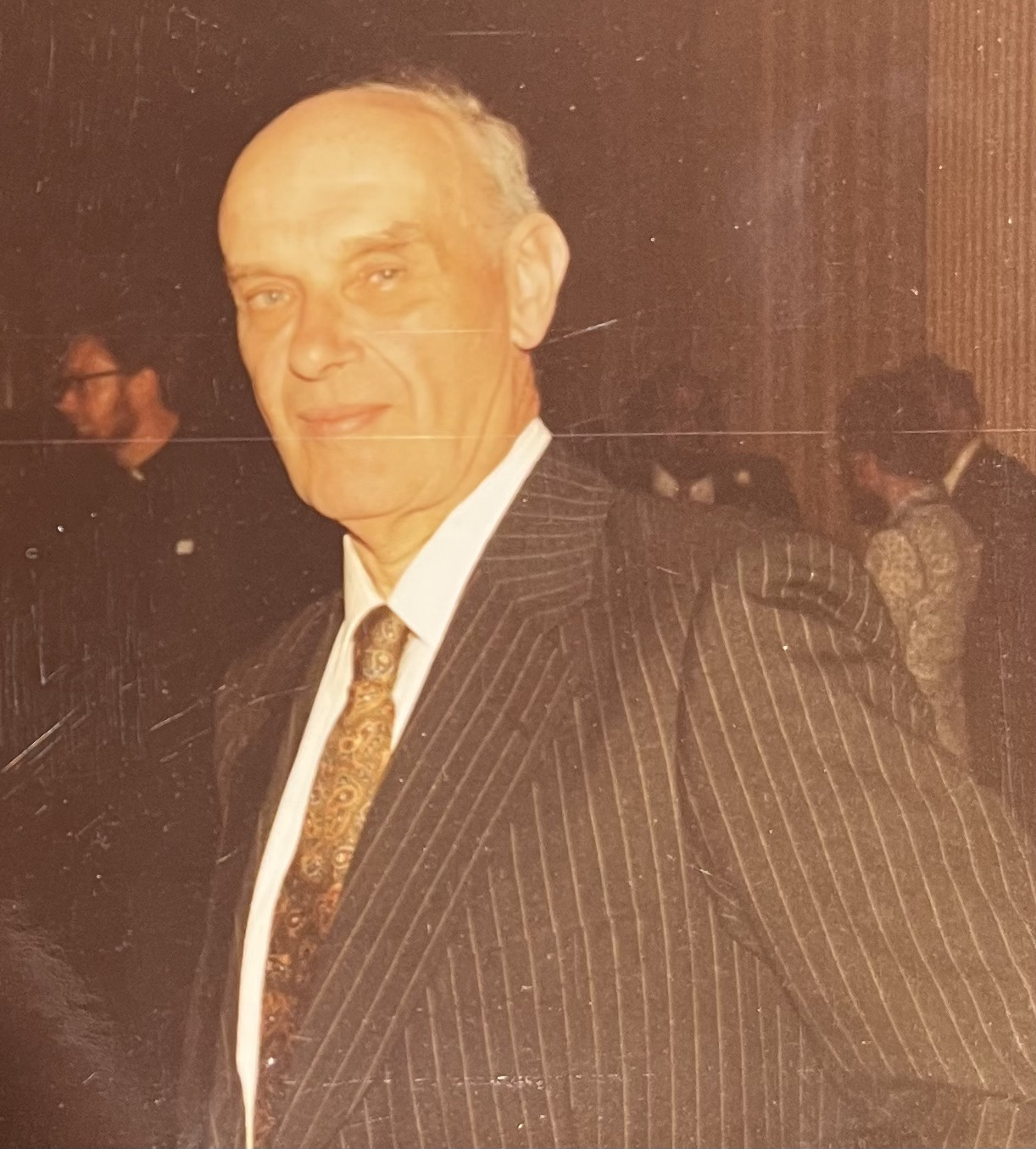
- Born: 28 June 1914; Belize
- Died: 20 February 1996 (aged 81)
- Occupation: Professor of Greek
- Known for: deep knowledge of Early Greek poets
- Title: Prof.
- Awards: FRSE, Commander of the Royal Order of the Phoenix

Academic background
- Education: University of Aberdeen, Sidney Sussex College, Cambridge

Academic work
- Discipline: Philologist
- Institutions: University of Edinburgh
- Notable students: John Chadwick, Julia Haig Gaisser
- Notable works: A plain guide to the decipherment of the Mycenean Linear B script

Arthur James Beattie, MA, FRSE (28 June 1914 – 20 February 1996) was a British classical philologist who was Professor of Greek at Edinburgh University from 1951 to 1981 and Dean of the Faculty of Arts, where he was notable for the advancement of the study of Classics, Greek and languages. In addition to his academic work, he also served as a cryptographer in World War II.

== Early life and education ==
He was born in Belize, British Honduras, where his father was an accountant and active in the mahogany trade. On the outbreak of World War I, his family returned to Scotland so that his father could enlist in the army. He was raised in Montrose, where he attended Montrose Academy, then progressing to Aberdeen University, graduating with first class honors in Classics in 1935. After graduating he put his scientific inclination to use by briefly being a demonstrator in zoology. His consequent life-long interest in Natural Science resulted in his being an expert in his favorite hobby of ornithology. His next step was Sidney Sussex College at Cambridge, where again he obtained a first class in the Classical tripos.

== Career ==
=== Military service ===
During World War II, he enlisted in the Royal Artillery, where using his skills he managed to translate German manuals on artillery into English. He was soon recruited by the Intelligence Corps with the rank of Major. He was an expert in interpreting captured documentation. His scientific flair emerged once again in his analysis of the German concrete Atlantic Wall, revealing its steel reinforcement, and allowing its neutralization in Normandy. It was thanks to this analysis that the section of the wall covering the beaches in Normandy could be effectively damaged by Allied bombing raids that made possible the subsequent landings in D-Day.

After the war, he worked with the Control Commission in Germany, where together Robert Birley was responsible for education reconstruction, removing any Nazi bent in the texts and in the staff at the University of Gottingen. This was the first German university to reopen and it owes much to Beattie. A volume presented to him by the Senate of the university bear the inscription on the flyleaf reading "To Major A. J. Beattie, M.A., in grateful remembrance for his activity in favor of the University of Gottingen in 1945". During this time in post-war Germany he contributed to set free Adolf Grimmer from a prison camp, the last Minister of Education in the state of Hanover and a pioneer in the use of film in education. He engaged in friendship with eminent figures, such as Hans Herter and the theoretical physicist Max Planck. The former was a pupil of the school of Ulrich von Wilamowitz-Moellendorff, the same one that his professor at Cambridge Frank Adcock had attended in the 1920s. This gave Beattie a bond with the most eminent classicists of his day.

=== Academic career ===
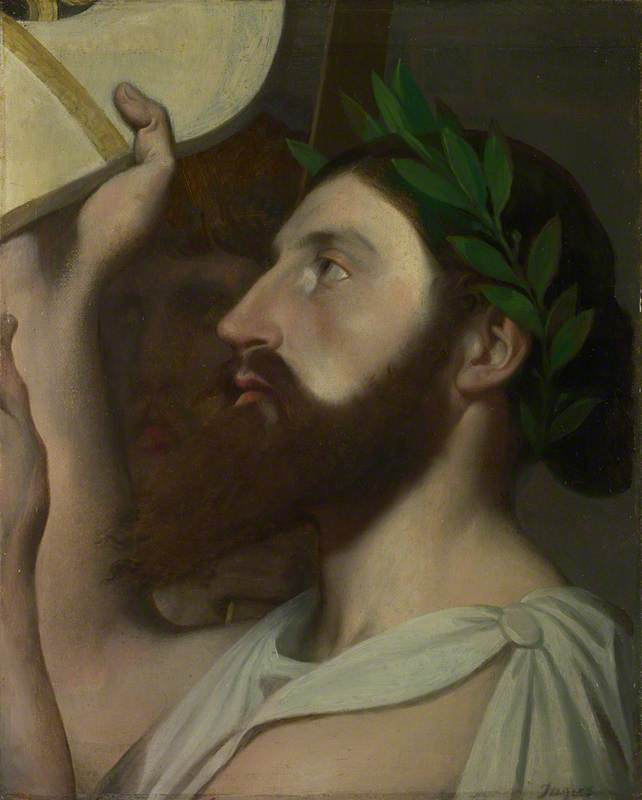
Pindar and Ictinus

In 1946 he returned to Cambridge, where at Sidney Sussex College took up a fellowship and then became a lecturer in Classics. Until 1951 he collaborated with Sir Denys Page and A.S.F. Gow on different publications. In 1951 he was appointed Chair of Greek at Edinburgh, in succession of Prof. Sir William Calder. His early publications in the classical journals showed his deep knowledge and interest in the early Greek poets, Alcman, Alcaeus, Sappho, and especially Pindar who, along with Aeschylus, was probably his favorite author, and on whom he lectured with enthusiasm and authority. The decipherment of Linear B in 1953 by Michael Ventris and John Chadwick, who had been a student of his at Cambridge, gave rise to a controversy. The script dated from the period from about 1450 BC when the Mycenaeans took over the Cretan palace settlements and dominated the Aegean area. Beattie adopted the orthodox view in rejecting the decipherment on the basis that Mycenaeans were not Greeks and had been ''adopted'' as ancestors by later Greeks engaged in the invention of a mythology. He explained the reasons of his doubts and disbelief in detailed articles in the Journal of Hellenic Studies (1956) and in Mitteilungen des Instituts für Orientforschung (1958), gathering support at the same time from a number of international scholars. The premature tragic death of Ventris in a car accident certainly contributed to alienating the two opposing sides in the dispute, and eventually the supporters of the decipherment have prevailed, making the theory universally accepted and making scholars base on this a range of assumptions about the classical world.

As the Dean of the Faculty of Arts he was proactive in promoting the study of Classics, setting up courses in Greek literature in translation and a beginner course in Greek for those who did not have the opportunity to study it in school. He also supported the teaching of modern Greek, and eventually this was offered as an option in classical honors. By close collaboration with the Greek Ministry of Culture and Science in Athens he arranged several cultural exchanges of scholars to give seminars on Greek culture, including its Byzantine and modern periods. Moreover, he engineered the acquisition of a substantial nucleus of modern Greek books for the library. At the same time, he was president to the Scottish Hellenic Society of Edinburgh, and his close relations with Greece led this government to award him in 1966 the Royal Order of the Phoenix, with the grade of Commander.

Beside Greek culture, he was instrumental in expanding the study of minority languages, especially in the near East. This may be due to his studying Sanskrit as an option when he was at Cambridge. He established the teaching of Chinese. He was a hard-working and effective administrator of the faculty, and thanks to his first-hand knowledge of the great sites of ancient Greece, such as Epidaurus and Delphi that he had already explored, and of Modern Greek, he was often keen to lead students trips to Sparta, home of Menelaus. When in 1964 Sir Edward Appleton retired as principal of the University of Edinburgh, he was regarded by many as possible candidate for his succession. However, the ethos of the times, encapsulated by C.P. Snow and the "two cultures" was not in his favor. Defined as "too dry a stick" by the Senate and Court of the University their choice fell on Michael Swann. When Beattie retired from the Chair of Greek in 1981 and Ian Campbell from the Chair of Humanity a year later, funding restrictions prevented replacements from being appointed. University structures were moving in the direction of ever-larger units. By 1987, the Classical departments were united into one, with John Richardson as the first Professor of Classics.

== Selected publications ==
- Linear B. Cambridge Review, 11 May 1957, Vol. 78, n°1907, p. 568–571 OCLC 1037945454
- A plain guide to the decipherment of the Mycenean Linear B script. Berlin Akademie-Verlag, 1958 OCLC 1128701502
- The 'Spice' tablets of Cnossos, Pylos and Mycenae. [An article, attempting to disprove the decipherment of Michael Ventris and John Chadwick] (Sonderdruck aus: Minoica – Festschrift zum 80. Geburtstag von Johannes Sundwall ... 1958). Berlin, 1958 OCLC 315923255
- A Cyprian exhortation to sobriety. Offprint from: Rheinisches Museum für Philologie. N.F. 101. 1958. OCLC 1006066837
- Hellenikē zōē : anagnōstiko tēs D' taxeōs tou dēmotikou. Athēnai: I.N. Siderēs, 1934. OCLC 314631798
- Book review: Marathon by W.K. Pritchett. The Journal of Hellenic Studies, vol. 83, 1963, pp. 193–193. OCLC 5548846190

== Awards ==
- In 1957 he was elected a Fellow of the Royal Society of Edinburgh.
- Wilson Travelling Fellowship, by Aberdeen University.
- In 1966 Commander of the Royal Order of the Phoenix, by the Greek government.

He acted as chairman of Morrison's Academy in Crieff, from 1962 to 1975, and as a governor of Sedbergh School from 1967 to 1978.

== Later life ==
In later years he committed to the study of Greek place-names, with a symbiotic use of his philological and topographical skills. Unfortunately this research remained unfinished. He remained a bachelor and was a keen regular at the New Club and the Scottish Arts Club in Edinburgh for a long time. He could appear to be prosaic and inward-looking, but always agreeable and with a dry humor. His friends found him true-hearted and sociable, showing him their affections by nicknaming him "Linear Beattie". He died after a short illness on 20 February 1996, aged 81.
