= Lord President Reid Professor of Law =

The Lord President Reid Chair of Law is a named academic position at the Edinburgh Law School, established in 1972 with W. A. Wilson as the inaugural holder. The following persons have held the office:

- Professor W. A. Wilson (1972–94).
- Professor George Gretton (1994–2016).
- Professor Alexandra Braun (2017- ).
