= Bert Whittington (engineer) =

Scottish academic and engineer

Bert Whittington FRSE FRSA FIEE
- Born: Herbert (Bert) William Whittington; 21 September 1945; Glasgow, United Kingdom
- Died: 11 March 2002 (aged 56); Edinburgh, United Kingdom
- Education: University of Strathclyde
- Awards: Fellow of the Royal Society of Edinburgh; FIEE; FRSA
- Scientific career
- Fields: Energy
- Workplaces: Central Electricity Generating Board; University of Edinburgh

Herbert William Whittington (21 September 1945 – 11 March 2002) was a Scottish electrical power engineer and energy expert who was a professor at the University of Edinburgh. Born in Glasgow, he graduated with his Bachelor's and PhD degrees in electrical engineering from the University of Strathclyde in 1967 and 1970.

== Career ==
On graduation, he joined the Central Electricity Generating Board (CEGB) as a research officer. In 1973, he joined the University of Edinburgh as a lecturer and was promoted to a Personal Chair in electrical power engineering in 1994.

Whittington's academic interests and activities were broad. His research career began in high voltage systems at the University of Strathclyde and the CEGB Central Electricity Research Laboratory in Leatherhead. In Edinburgh, he became interested in equipment condition monitoring, including debris detection in lubrication oil, which resulted in several patents.

With Harold Dickinson, he initiated a research programme at Edinburgh on rural electrification in developing countries. He later concentrated on energy policy in the UK, including a sabbatical with the Scottish Executive. He was appointed as a special adviser on energy policy to the House of Commons Select Committee on Trade and Industry

Whittington was active in professional committee work for UK and European engineering organisations. He was a member of the Senate of the Engineering Council, and he was Chairman of the Institution of Electrical Engineers (IEE) Scotland, during which he was central to the establishment of the Scottish Engineering Centre at the Teacher Building in Glasgow.

Alongside his engineering career, Whittington was a talented footballer, playing professionally for Ayr United while studying at Strathclyde.

== Recognition ==
In recognition of his contributions to electrical power, he was awarded Fellowship of the Royal Society of Edinburgh in 1991, Fellowship of the Institution of Engineering and Technology, Fellowship of the Royal Society of Arts, and Chartered Engineer.

Following his death in 2002, the University of Edinburgh formally renamed the Established Chair in Electrical Engineering, held by Ewart Farvis and John Mavor, as the Bert Whittington Chair of Electrical Power Engineering. The first holder of the post was Professor Janusz Bialek (2003–2009), and the incumbent is Professor Gareth Harrison (2011–present).
