= George Dunbar (classical scholar) =

Scottish classical scholar and lexicographer

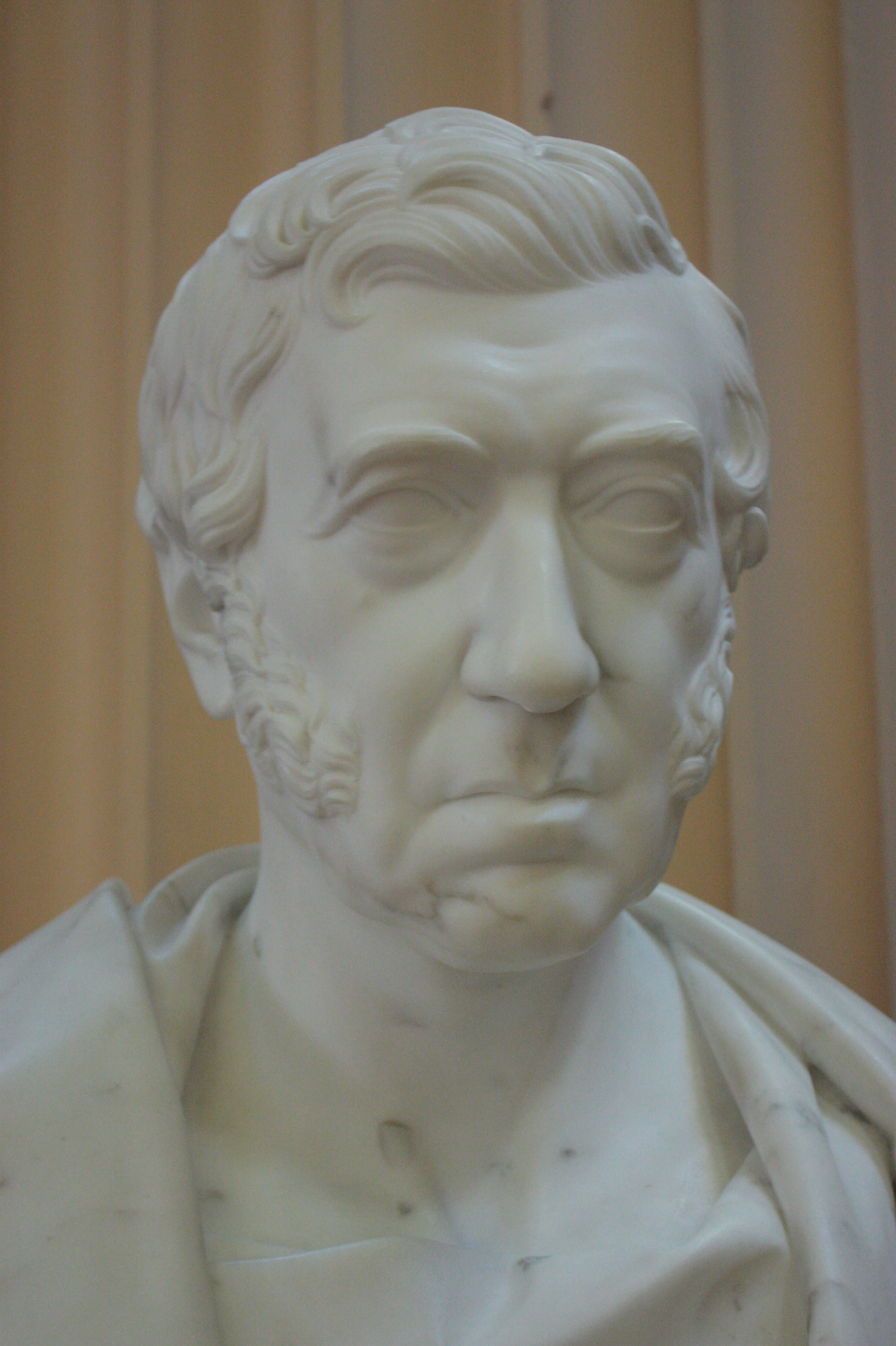
Bust of Prof George Dunbar by Peter Slater 1851, Old College, University of Edinburgh

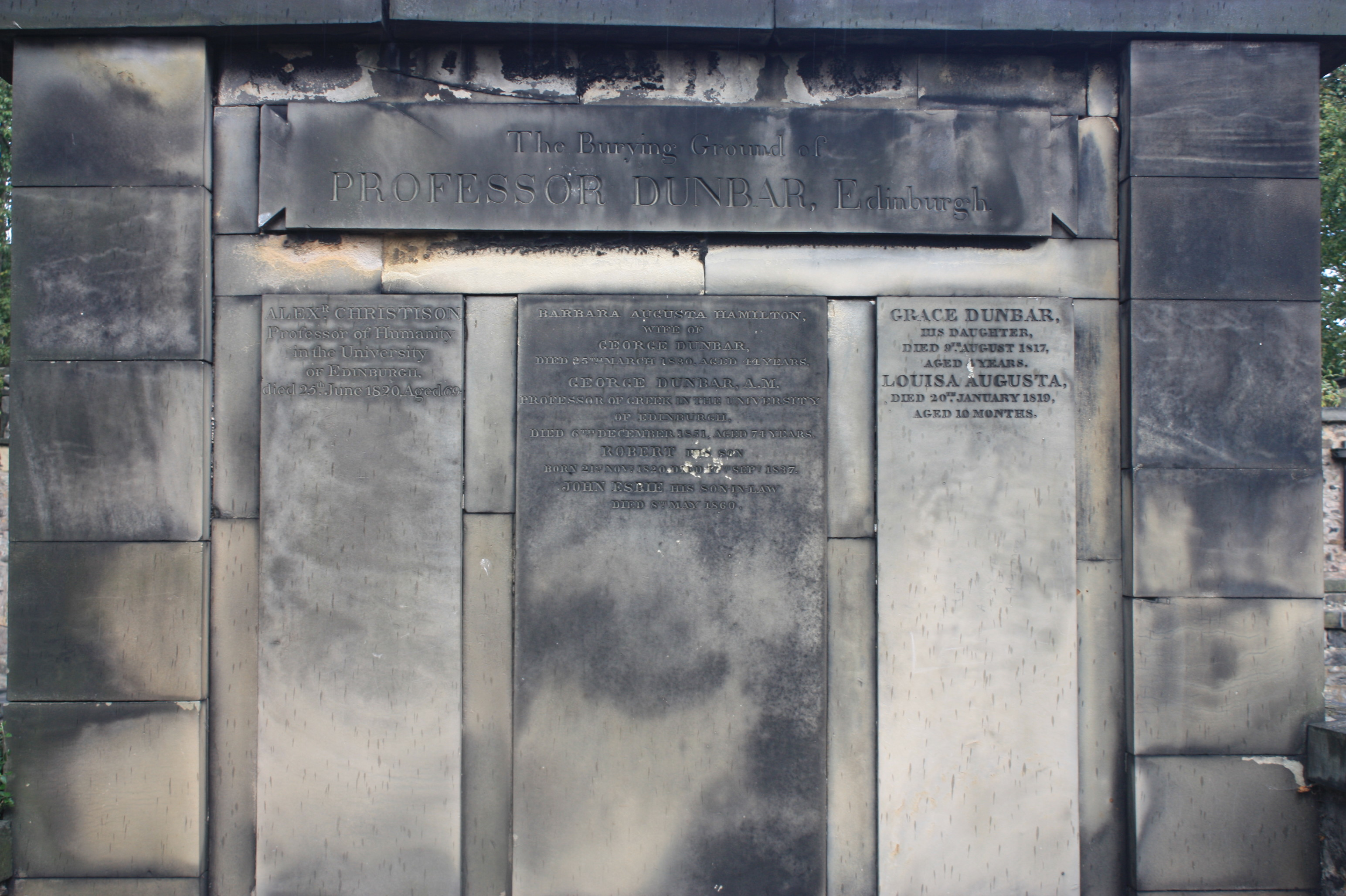
Prof George Dunbar's grave, Greyfriars Kirkyard

George Dunbar FRSE (30 March 1774 – 6 December 1851) was a Scottish classical scholar, Professor of Greek at the University of Edinburgh, and lexicographer who authored a classical Greek dictionary.

== Biography ==
George Dunbar was born on 30 March 1777 at Coldingham in Berwickshire. In early life he was a gardener, however having been permanently injured by an accident, he instead chose to study the classics.

At about the age of 30 he moved to Edinburgh, and from 1800 to 1805 worked as a tutor to the family of Lord Provost Sir William Fettes. In 1806 he was elected a Fellow of the Royal Society of Edinburgh.

In 1807, Dunbar succeeded Andrew Dalzell as Professor of Greek at the University of Edinburgh, having acted as Dalzell's assistant for many years. Dunbar held his appointment until his death on 6 December 1851.

In the 1830s his address is given as Rose Park, Edinburgh.

He died at his home Rose Park in Trinity in north Edinburgh on 6 December 1851. He is buried with his wife, Barbara Augusta Hamilton, in the western extension of Greyfriars Kirkyard on the western path. Professor Alexander Christison is buried in the same plot.

Rose Park was demolished in 1962 and replaced by a block of flats.

== Assessment ==
Dunbar is remembered for his Greek-English and English-Greek lexicon (1840), on the compilation of which he spent eight years. Although now superseded, it was the best work of its kind that had appeared in the United Kingdom.
