= Regius Professor of Public Law and the Law of Nature and Nations =

Regius Chair of Public Law and the Law of Nature and Nations University of Edinburgh
- Incumbent; Neil Walker since 2008
- Precursor: Regius Chair of Law
- Formation: 1707
- First holder: Charles Erskine

The Regius Chair of Public Law and the Law of Nature and Nations is a Regius Professorship at the University of Edinburgh. It was established in 1707 by Queen Anne, and was the first chair in law created at the university.

== History ==
The chair was founded in 1707, the year of the union of Scotland and England, by Queen Anne, and was the university's first chair in Law. Its first occupant was Charles Erskine, who was appointed on 7 November aged only twenty-seven years, despite the Town Council's objections. Erskine later served as Lord Advocate and then Lord Justice Clerk.

In 1972, Neil MacCormick was appointed to the chair. He had previously taught jurisprudence at the University of St Andrews and Balliol College, Oxford. MacCormick came to be recognised as amongst the world's leading contemporary jurists, and was knighted in 2001 for his services to law. From 1999 to 2004, he was an SNP Member of the European Parliament for Scotland. MacCormick retired in 2008 and was succeeded by Neil Walker.

== Professors ==
- 2008–present: Neil Walker
- 1972–2008: Sir Neil MacCormick
- 1945–? Archibald Hunter Campbell
- 1922–1945 William Wilson
- 1890–1922 Ludovic James Grant
- 1862–1890 James Lorimer
- 1832–1862 vacant
- 1796–1832 Robert Hamilton
- 1779–1796 Allan Maconochie, Lord Meadowbank
- 1764–1779 James Balfour
- 1759–1764 Robert Bruce, Lord Kennet
- 1735–1759 George Abercrombie
- 1734–1735 William Kirkpatrick
- 1707–?: Charles Erskine

== See also ==
- University of Edinburgh School of Law
