= Andrew Dalzell =

Scottish scholar

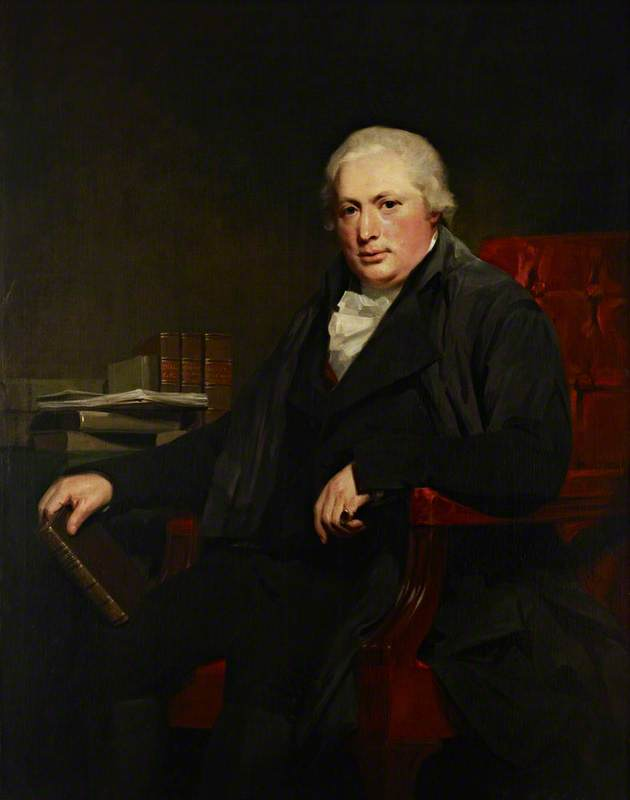
- Born: 1742; Newliston
- Died: 1806 (aged 63–64); Edinburgh
- Other names: Dalziel, Andrew
- Occupation: Scottish classicist

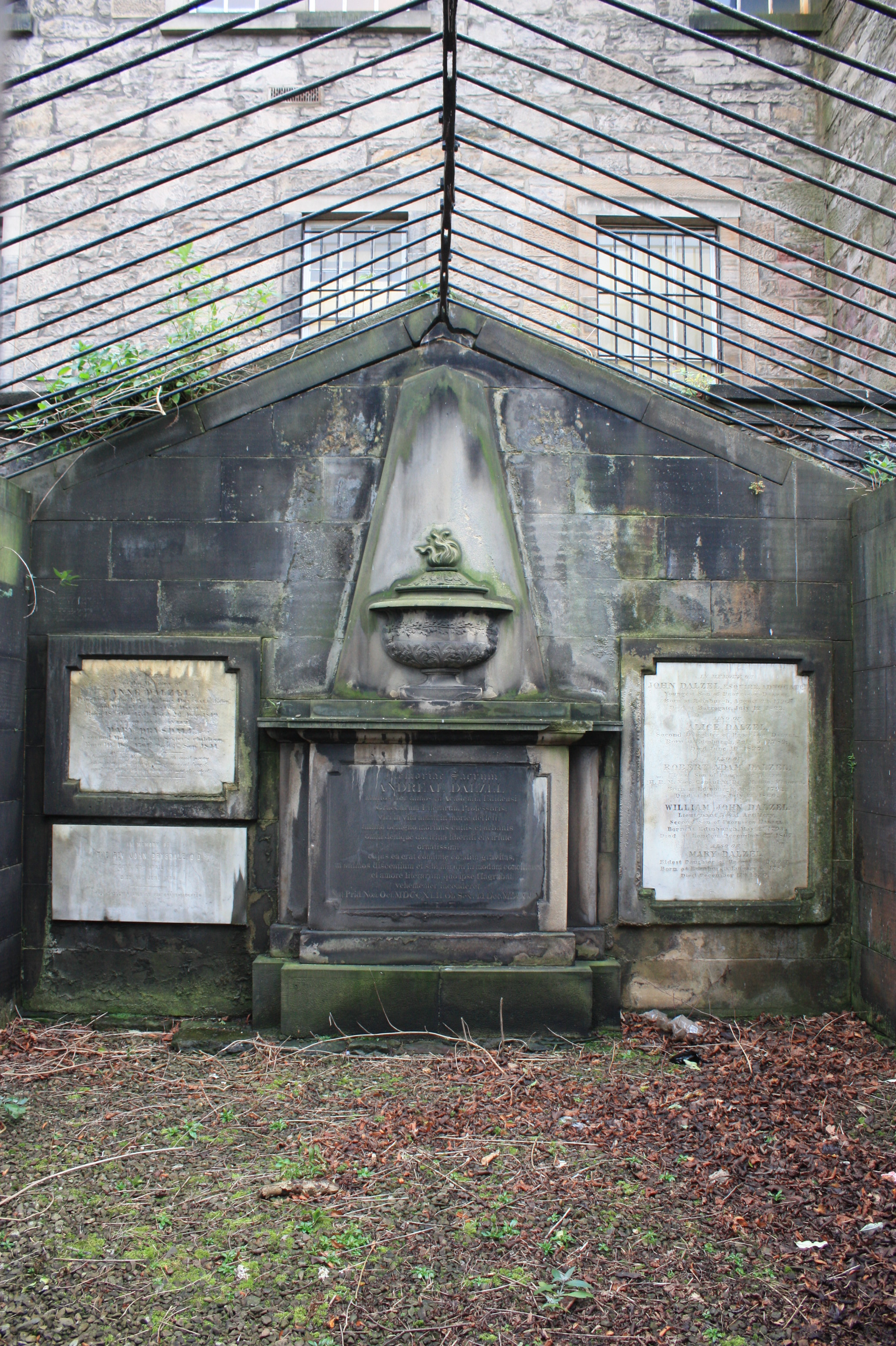
The dramatic burial vault of Andrew Dalzel, Greyfriars Kirkyard, Edinburgh

Andrew Dalzell (sometimes shown as Andrew Dalzel or Andrew Dalziel) FRSE (1742–1806) was a Scottish scholar, Professor of Greek at the University of Edinburgh, and prominent figure during the Scottish Enlightenment. In 1783 he was a co-founder of the Royal Society of Edinburgh.

== Life ==
He was born in Gateside, Newliston near Linlithgow on 6 October 1742 the youngest son of William Dalzell, a carpenter, and his wife Alice Linn. His father died in 1751 and the young Dalzell then fell into the financial care of his namesake and uncle, the Rev Andrew Dalzell of Stoneykirk but remaining in Newliston under the supervision of Rev John Drysdale of Kirkliston. His early education was at Kirkliston Parish School, and then he attended Edinburgh University studying to be a minister in the footsteps of his uncle and adoptive father, but he was never licensed to preach.

Instead (around 1765) he became the personal tutor of the Lauderdale family teaching in particular the young James (1758–1839), Thomas and Robert, later Lord Liston, the latter becoming a lifelong friend. He is said to have taken his pupils to Glasgow to hear the lectures of John Millar on Civil Law.

In 1772 his various contacts brought about his achieving the position of Professor of Greek at Edinburgh University. This brought him into contact with the critical figures of the Scottish Enlightenment, most of which were in Edinburgh. He also served other roles; being Keeper of the College Library from 1785, and Principal Clerk to the General Assembly of the Church of Scotland from 1788 (the first layman to hold this role). Curiously his address is given simply as College at this period, as he lived in tied accommodation within Old College.

As Professor of Greek, he taught the future author Sir Walter Scott, who records angering the Professor:

'I had the audacity to produce a composition in which I weighted Homer against Ariosto and pronounced him wanting in the balance[...] The wrath of the Professor was extreme[...] He pronounced upon me the severe sentence that dunce I was and dunce I would remain[...] which however, my excellent and learned friend lived to revoked over a bottle of Burgundy, at our Literary Club at Fortune's, of which he is a distinguished member'.

In 1783 he was a founder member of the Royal Society of Edinburgh and served as their Literary Secretary from 1789 to 1796.

In 1789 he was not chosen as Clerk to the General Assembly of the Church of Scotland in opposition to Dr Carlyle of Inveresk, Carlyle gaining a small majority.

He died (after a long illness) on 8 December 1806. He is buried in Greyfriars Kirkyard in central Edinburgh. His burial vault lies against the south wall and is highly defensive in design, being constructed at the height of the graverobbing fears in Edinburgh.

His role as Professor of Greek was taken over by George Dunbar who had acted as his assistant for many years.

== Family ==
He married Ann Drysdale in 1786. She was daughter of the Very Rev John Drysdale (1718–1788) who was Moderator of the Church of Scotland in both 1773 and 1784. Dalzell presumably met her through this connection.

== Publications ==
- Principles of Latin and English Grammar (1772) (co-written with Alexander Adam)
- Substance of Lectures on the Ancient Greeks, and on the Revival of Greek Learning in Europe, delivered by Prof Andrew Dalzell (published by John Dalzell, advocate, posthumously, 1821)
