= List of private schools in Scotland =

The following is a partial list of currently operating private schools in Scotland.

Many of the schools are perceived to be heavily influenced by the culture, practices and ethos of English independent, or "public", schools. Author James Robertson described Glenalmond College as "a Scottish boarding school modeled on the English public school system". The perceived English influence in many of these schools was such that in 1887 one author referred to them as "English schools". 43% of Scottish independent secondary schools offer boarding as an option, (especially for pupils from the western isles attending mainland schools) although there is more of a trend to attend as a day pupil compared to in England.

There are 91 independent schools across Scotland of which 71 are members of the Scottish Council of Independent Schools (SCIS). According to the SCIS, its members educate around 29,000 pupils in Scotland representing around 4.2% of the school age population in Scotland. The figure is significantly higher in Edinburgh, with around 1 in 4 pupils educated at an independent school, the highest proportion in the UK. This figure has risen to 30 per cent in recent years.

Scottish students from independent schools are over-represented at the four ancient universities of Scotland. They represented 26% of the student body at the four institutions in 2014/15 with 71% in total receiving an offer of admission at one of the four ancient universities compared to only 29% of state-school entrants.

== List of schools ==
=== North ===
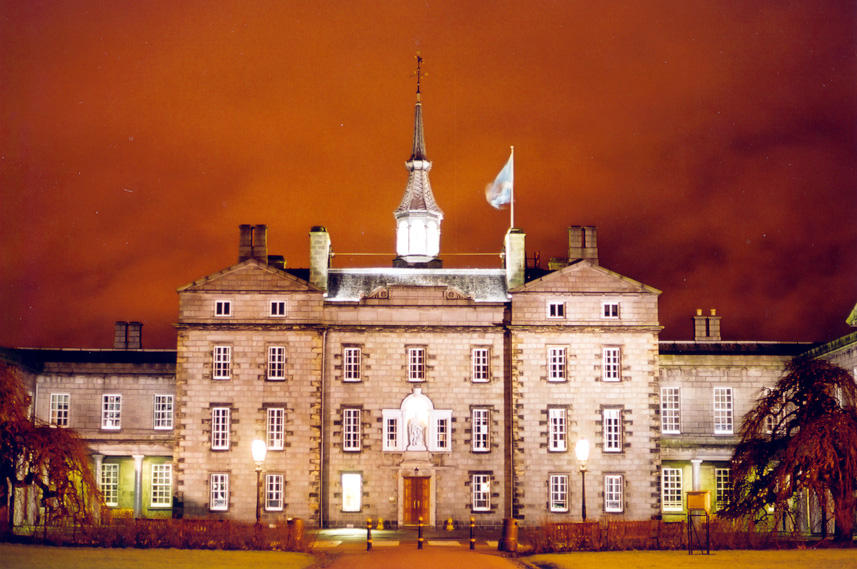
The "Auld Hoose" of Robert Gordon's College

- Albyn School, Aberdeen
- Gordonstoun, Elgin
- International School of Aberdeen, Aberdeen
- Lathallan School, Johnshaven
- Robert Gordon's College, Aberdeen
- St Margaret's School for Girls, Aberdeen

=== Central & Tayside ===
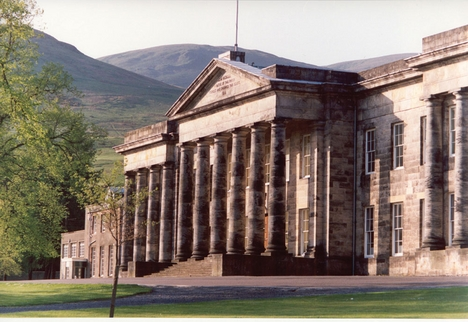
Playfair Building, Dollar Academy

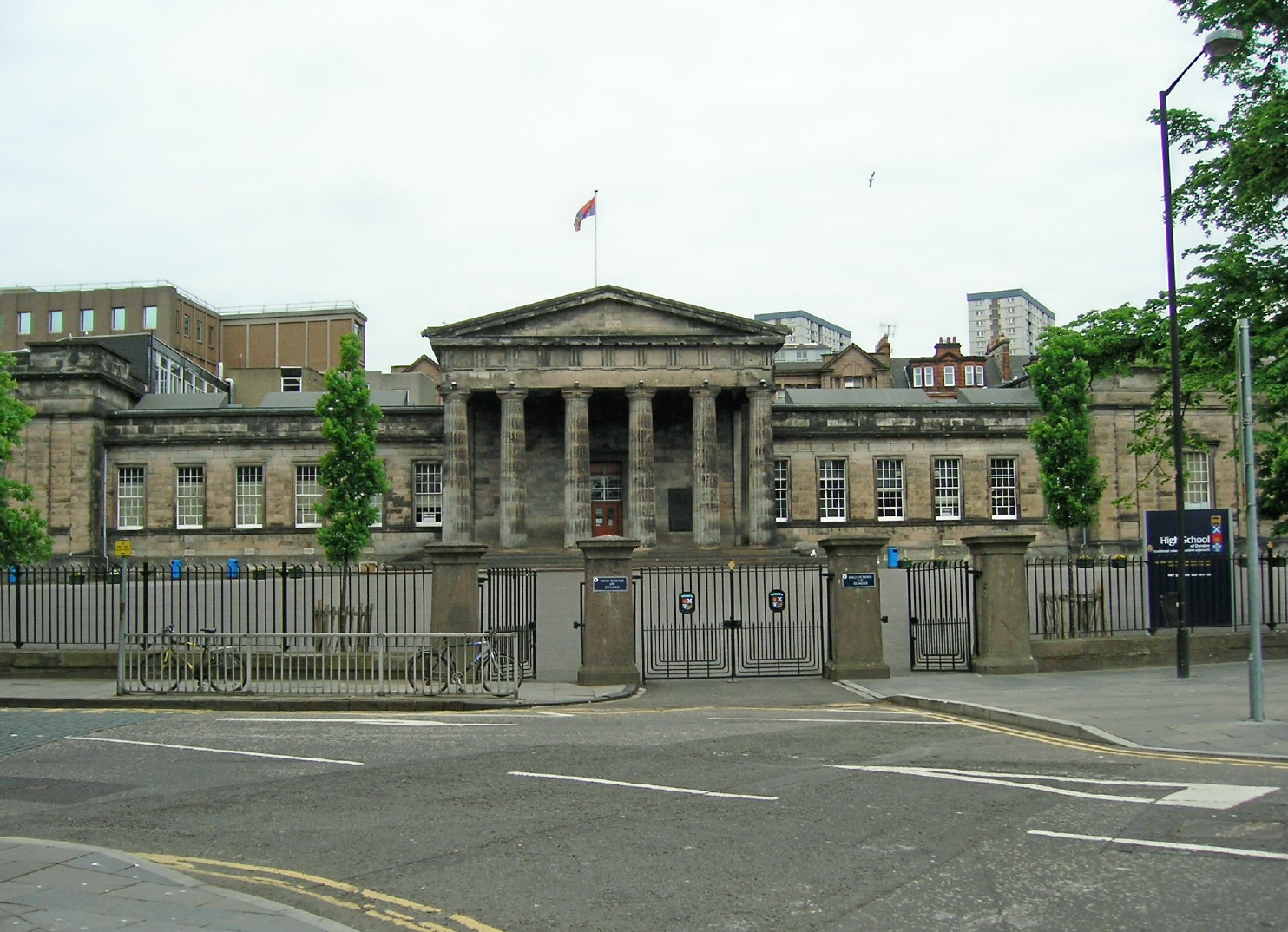
The High School of Dundee

- Ardvreck School, Crieff
- Craigclowan Preparatory School, Perth
- Dollar Academy
- Glenalmond College, Glenalmond
- The High School of Dundee
- Morrison's Academy, Crieff
- Queen Victoria School, Dunblane
- Strathallan School, Forgandenny

=== Fife ===
- St Leonards School, St. Andrews

=== Edinburgh City Region ===
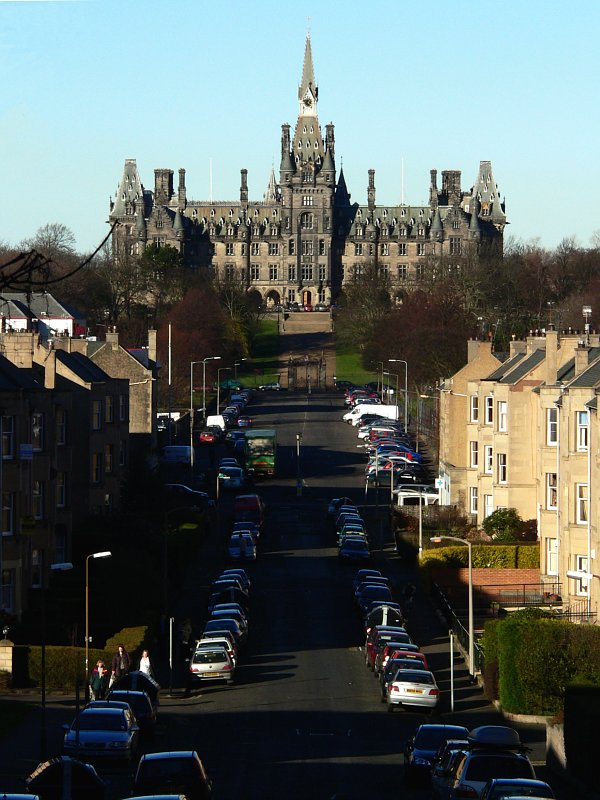
Fettes College

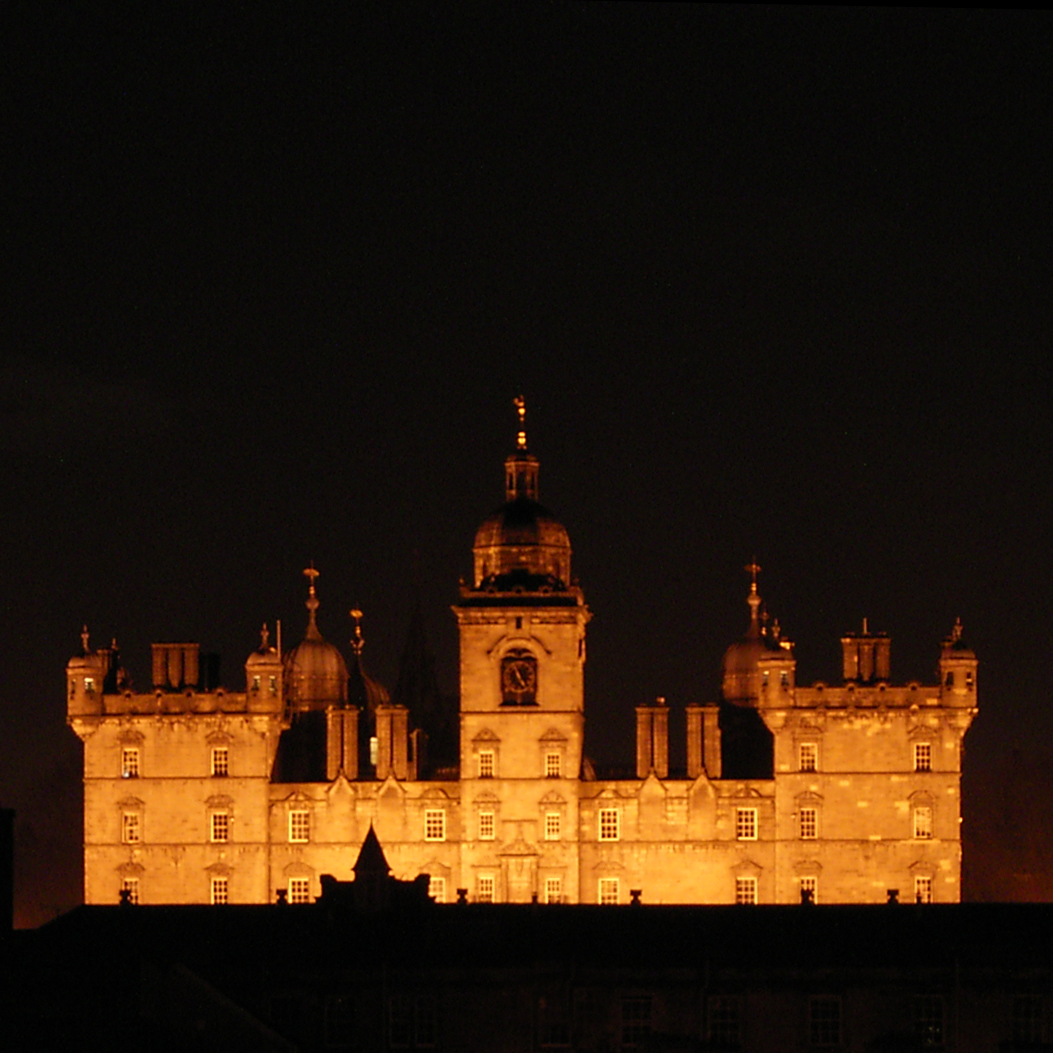
George Heriot's School

- Belhaven Hill School, Dunbar
- Cargilfield Preparatory School
- Clifton Hall School
- The Edinburgh Academy
  - The Mary Erskine School
  - Stewart's Melville College
- Fettes College
- George Heriot's School
- George Watson's College
- Loretto School, Musselburgh
- Merchiston Castle School
- St. George's School
- St. Mary's Music School

=== Glasgow City Region ===
- Belmont House School, Newton Mearns
- Fernhill School, Rutherglen
- The Glasgow Academy, Kelvinbridge
- Hamilton College
- The High School of Glasgow, Anniesland
- Hutchesons' Grammar School, Pollokshields
- Kelvinside Academy, Kelvinside
- Lomond School, Helensburgh
- St. Aloysius' College, Garnethill
- St. Columba's School, Kilmacolm

=== Ayrshire ===
- Wellington School, Ayr

=== Borders ===
- St. Mary's School, Melrose

=== Additional Support Needs / Complex Additional Needs Schools ===
- Donaldson's School, Linlithgow
- The Royal Blind School, Edinburgh

== Figures ==
=== Fees ===
The schools are ranked here by day school pupil fees for 2023/24 and boarding fees are given where applicable. In cases where the 2023/24 fees are not yet available, this is indicated next to the figures. Membership of the Headmasters' and Headmistresses' Conference (HMC) is indicated, as well as the curriculum followed by the school: English (i.e. GCSEs, A-levels), Scottish (i.e. Standard Grades/Intermediates, Highers, Advanced Highers), Mixed English and Scottish, or International Baccalaureate (IB).

School	Day fees	Boarder fees	Curriculum	HMC
Fettes College	£37,050	£44,100	English/IB	Yes
Gordonstoun School	£35,601	£48,990	English	Yes
Merchiston Castle School	£29,250	£40,320	English	Yes
Strathallan School	£27,360	£41,829	English/Scottish	Yes
Glenalmond College	£25,275 (22/23)	£41,145 (22/23)	English	Yes
Loretto School	£25,155 (22/23)	£36,945 (22/23)	English	Yes
Lathallan School	£23,304	£31,950	Scottish	No
St Leonards School, St Andrews	£18,765	£44,232	IB	Yes
St. George's School, Edinburgh	£18,324	£37,575	English/Scottish	No
St. Mary's School, Melrose	£17,940 (22/23)	£20,640 (22/23)	Scottish	No
Morrison's Academy, Crieff	£17,575	n/a	Scottish	Yes
Edinburgh Academy	£17,541	n/a	English/Scottish	Yes
The High School of Glasgow	£16,959	n/a	Scottish	Yes
Dollar Academy	£16,677	£38,601	Scottish	Yes
St Margaret's School for Girls, Aberdeen	£16,632	n/a	Scottish	No
International School Aberdeen	£16,535	n/a	IB	No
George Heriot's	£16,440	n/a	Scottish	Yes
Clifton Hall School, Edinburgh	£16,380	n/a	Scottish	No
Hutchesons' Grammar School	£16,177	n/a	Scottish	Yes
The High School of Dundee	£16,050	n/a	Scottish	Yes
Mary Erskine School, Edinburgh	£16,041	£32,190	Scottish	No
Stewart's Melville College, Edinburgh	£16,041	£32,190	Scottish	Yes
Albyn School, Aberdeen	£15,995	n/a	Scottish	Yes
George Watson's College, Edinburgh	£15,951	n/a	Scottish/IB	Yes
Kelvinside Academy	£15,951	n/a	Scottish	Yes
Robert Gordon's College, Aberdeen	£20,406 (inc. VAT)	n/a	Scottish	Yes
Wellington School, Ayr	£15,645	n/a	Scottish	No
St. Columba's, Kilmacolm	£15,610	n/a	Scottish	Yes
Belmont House School	£15,492	n/a	Scottish	No
St. Aloysius' College	£14,976	n/a	Scottish	Yes
Lomond School	£14,925	£36,200	Scottish	Yes
The Glasgow Academy	£14,850	n/a	Scottish	Yes
Hamilton College	£13,875	n/a	Scottish	No

=== Exam results ===
Results of English Qualifications
The below schools follow the English exam curriculum, and are ranked according to the percentage of A-levels achieved at A*/A, as recorded in The Telegraph in 2015.

	School	A/A* A-level (%)	A/A* GCSE (%)	HMC
1	George Watson's College	55.4	(No data)	Yes
2	The Edinburgh Academy	46.1	40.6	Yes
3	Fettes College	45.0	68.0	Yes
4	St Leonards School	43.2	41.2	Yes
5	Merchiston Castle School	38.6	69.3	Yes
6	Loretto School	37.5	49.7	Yes
7	St George's School, Edinburgh	34.8	48.9	No
8	Glenalmond College	31.5	52.8	Yes

Results of International Baccalaureate
The below schools offer the International Baccalaureate as a qualification, and are ranked according to the average score achieved out of a maximum 45 points.

	School	Average Score (/45)	>40 points (%)	HMC
1	Fettes College	36.9	34	Yes
2	George Watson's College	34.0	(No data)	Yes
3	St Leonards School	33.0	13.0	Yes

== See also ==
- List of schools in Scotland
- Education in Scotland
- List of UK Independent Schools
- List of the oldest schools in the United Kingdom
- Education Scotland
