= Scottish Council of Independent Schools =

Scottish Council of Independent Schools (SCIS)
- Type: Registered charity, umbrella body
- Registration no.: Scottish Charity No. SC018033
- Purpose: Membership body of Scottish private schools
- Location: 1 Lochrin Square, 92-94 Fountainbridge, Edinburgh EH3 9QA
- Key people: Lorraine Davidson (CEO)
- Website: scis.org.uk

The Scottish Council of Independent Schools (SCIS) is a registered Scottish charity which represents the independent school sector in Scotland. Its membership includes mainstream fee-paying independent schools and a range of schools for young people with complex additional support needs.

== Background ==
Independent Schools in Scotland are inspected by the national school inspectorate, Education Scotland; pastoral services including nursery and boarding are regulated by the Care Inspectorate.

The majority of Scottish independent schools are registered charities, as their purpose is the advancement of education. As such, their charitable activities are overseen by the Office of the Scottish Charity Regulator which is responsible for confirming independent schools' public benefit by means of a charity test required by the Charities and Trustee Investment (Scotland) Act 2005. SCIS was founded in 1978 and became a company and charity in 1990. SCIS represents over 70 member schools in Scotland.

As of 2016, there were 29,647 pupils in SCIS independent schools. 1,455 of those children are in nurseries, 10,416 pupils are in primary schools and 17,786 are in senior schools.

The overall number of boarding school pupils in Scotland in 2013 was 3,072. A SCIS sub-brand, Scotland's Boarding Schools, details the boarding sector in Scotland.

== Structure ==
The organisation has a small staff team of six, and provides a range of Professional Learning and Development (CPD), communications and marketing for the independent sector, advice and guidance to parents and families, and liaison with the Scottish Government, Scottish Parliament, public and education bodies. It is governed by a Board composed of elected Heads, Chairs and Bursars of independent schools in membership.

The current Chief Executive of SCIS is Lorraine Davidson who previously worked for the Scottish Government where she was responsible for Head of Education Strategy, including leading the National Discussion on Education, Head of vaccine oversight during the COVID-19 rollout in Scotland, and Head of European Engagement in preparation for Brexit.

SCIS works in association with the Independent Schools Council on UK-wide matters.

== Functions ==
The main functions of SCIS are:

- To promote, advance and support education in schools in Scotland at which full time education is provided not being schools maintained by a local education authority.
- To act as a means of communication between Independent Schools and any government department or any public or private authority or body connection with matters relating to the advancement of education, the development of curricula, the training of teachers and the development of teaching skills, methods and aids,.
- To provide advice and assistance to schools on all aspects of educational policy and the advancement of education, the development of curricula, the training of teachers and the development of teaching skills, methods and aids.
- To provide facilities for the training of teachers and development of teaching skills.

SCIS's key aims are to deliver the following specific services through CPD, regulatory and legal guidance, and additional events and publications:

Service to Schools:

- to support member schools in delivering a high quality, values-based education for all pupils
- to provide up-to-date guidance and advice to schools on key political, educational, pastoral, special and additional support needs, legal and financial issues
- to make information accessible to parents and young people, the media, political and community figures and the general public
- to support Governors, Heads, Bursars, teaching and support staff through the SCIS CPD programme
- to provide research to help schools with their education choices, forward planning and marketing strategies.

Promoting the Sector:

- to represent the sector at national, regional and community events concerned with the education, well-being and care of children and young people in Scotland
- to promote the sector to members of the Scottish and UK Government, the Scottish and UK Parliament, the media, national educational and other bodies, in order to foster a better and more informed understanding of the sector
- to highlight and support the particular educational and pastoral responsibilities of special schools
- to promote the sector to parents, challenge misconceptions, to encourage participation and widen access to the sector
- to secure, market and enhance the global reputation of the independent sector – including the promotion of Scotland's boarding schools.

Service to Education:

- to contribute to the development of education in its widest sense for children and young people aged 3–18 in Scotland
- to promote excellence in academic and all-round achievement
- to support highly qualified and well-resourced teaching and support staff
- to defend the independence, autonomy and founding principles of individual institutions
- to engage constructively with employers, further and higher education to ensure the widest choice of positive learner destinations
- to demonstrate the sector's breadth and excellence in curricular and qualification development
- to support quality improvement with proportionate, informed and responsive inspections.

== Membership ==
SCIS represents over 70 member schools in Scotland, including:

- Al Qalam Primary School, Glasgow
- Albyn School, Aberdeen
- Ardvreck School, Crieff
- Basil Paterson Middle School, Edinburgh
- Beaconhurst, Bridge of Allan
- Belhaven Hill School, Dunbar
- Belmont House School, Glasgow
- Cargilfield Preparatory School, Edinburgh
- Cedars School of Excellence, Greenock
- Clifton Hall School, Edinburgh
- The Compass School, Haddington
- Craigclowan Preparatory School, Perth
- Craigholme School, Glasgow
- Dollar Academy
- The Edinburgh Academy
- Edinburgh Montessori Arts School
- Edinburgh Steiner School
- ESMS Junior School, Edinburgh
- Fernhill School, Glasgow
- Fettes College, Edinburgh
- George Heriot's School, Edinburgh
- George Watson's College, Edinburgh
- The Glasgow Academy
- Glenalmond College
- Gordonstoun, Elgin
- Hamilton College
- The Hamilton School, Aberdeen
- High School of Dundee
- The High School of Glasgow
- Hutchesons' Grammar School, Glasgow
- International School of Aberdeen
- Kelvinside Academy, Glasgow
- Kilgraston School, Bridge of Earn
- Lathallan School, Johnshaven by Montrose
- Lomond School, Helensburgh
- Loretto School, Musselburgh
- The Mary Erskine School, Edinburgh
- Merchiston Castle School, Edinburgh
- Moray Steiner School, Forres
- Morrison's Academy, Crieff
- Queen Victoria School, Dunblane
- Regius School, Edinburgh
- Robert Gordon's College, Aberdeen
- St Aloysius' College, Glasgow
- St Columba's School, Kilmacolm
- St George's School, Edinburgh
- St Leonards School, St Andrews
- St Margaret's School for Girls, Aberdeen
- St Mary's Music School, Edinburgh
- St. Mary's School, Melrose
- Stewart's Melville College, Edinburgh
- Strathallan School, Forgandenny
- Wellington School, Ayr

Special Schools

- Ardfern School, Johnstone
- Closeburn House and Maben House, Dumfries
- Common Thread schools, Dumfries
- Corseford School, Kilbarchan
- Daldorch House School & Arran House
- Donaldson's School, Linlithgow
- Dunedin School, Edinburgh
- Falkland House School
- Harmeny, Balerno, Edinburgh
- Hillside School, Aberdour
- Moore House Care and Education, Bathgate
- The New School, Butterstone, Dunkeld
- New Struan School, Alloa
- Rathbone, Kilmarnock
- Royal Blind School, Edinburgh
- Scottish Centre for Children with Motor Impairments, Cumbernauld
- Seamab School, Rumbling Bridge
- Stanmore House School, Lanark
- Starley Hall School, Burntisland
- Troup House School, Gamrie

== See also ==
- Independent school (United Kingdom): Scotland
- List of independent schools in Scotland
