= List of schools in Aberdeen =

- List of schools in the Aberdeen City council area, Scotland. (An asterisk denotes a privately funded school.)

There are 14 secondary schools (11 state, 3 private); 52 primary schools (48 state, 4 private) and 1 state special educational needs schools.

All the listed state schools are run by Aberdeen City Council.

== Secondary schools ==
- Aberdeen Grammar School
- Albyn School *
- Bridge of Don Academy
- Bucksburn Academy
- Cults Academy
- Dyce Academy
- Harlaw Academy
- Hazlehead Academy
- Lochside Academy (formerly Torry Academy and Kincorth Academy - merged in 2018)
- Northfield Academy
- Oldmachar Academy
- Robert Gordon's College *
- St Machar Academy
- St Margaret's School for Girls *
- The International School Aberdeen *

== Primary schools ==
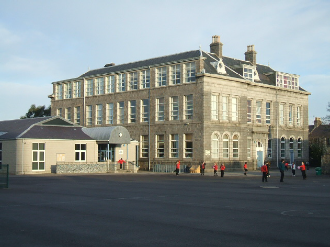
Ashley Road Primary is one of the 48 state primary schools in Aberdeen, feeding into Aberdeen Grammar School.

- Abbotswell Primary School
- Airyhall Primary School
- Albyn School *
- Ashley Road Primary School
- Braehead Primary School
- Bramble Brae Primary School
- Brimmond Primary School
- Broomhill Primary School
- Charleston Primary School
- Cornhill Primary School
- Culter Primary School
- Cults Primary School
- Danestone Primary School
- Dyce Primary School
- Fernielea Primary School
- Ferryhill Primary School
- Forehill Primary School
- Gilcomstoun Primary School
- Glashieburn Primary School
- Greenbrae Primary School
- Hanover Street Primary School
- Hazlehead Primary School
- Heathryburn Primary School
- Holy Family Roman Catholic Primary School
- Kaimhill Primary School
- Kingsford Primary School
- Kingswells Primary School
- Kirkhill Primary School
- Kittybrewster Primary School
- Loirston Primary School
- Manor Park Primary School
- Middleton Park Primary School
- Mile-End Primary School
- Milltimber Primary School
- Muirfield Primary School
- Quarryhill Primary School
- Riverbank Primary School
- Robert Gordon's College *
- Scotstown Primary School
- Seaton Primary School
- Skene Square Primary School
- St Joseph's Roman Catholic Primary School
- St Margaret's School for Girls *
- St Peter's Roman Catholic Primary School
- Stoneywood Primary School
- Sunnybank Primary School
- The International School Aberdeen *
- Tullos Primary School
- Westpark Primary School
- Woodside Primary School

== Special Schools ==
- Orchard Brae School
