= Aberdeen Academy =

Aberdeen Academy may refer to:

- Hazlehead Academy, successor to the former school named "Aberdeen Academy" from 1954 to 1969
- List of schools in Aberdeen containing several secondary schools with the suffix Academy in the city of Aberdeen, Scotland
- Aberdeen F.C. Reserves and Academy, youth department of the city's professional football club
