= Her Majesty's Inspector of Schools =

Her Majesty's Inspector of Schools can refer to:

- Her Majesty's Inspectorate of Education, Scotland
- Her Majesty's Chief Inspector of Schools In England
