= Albyn School =

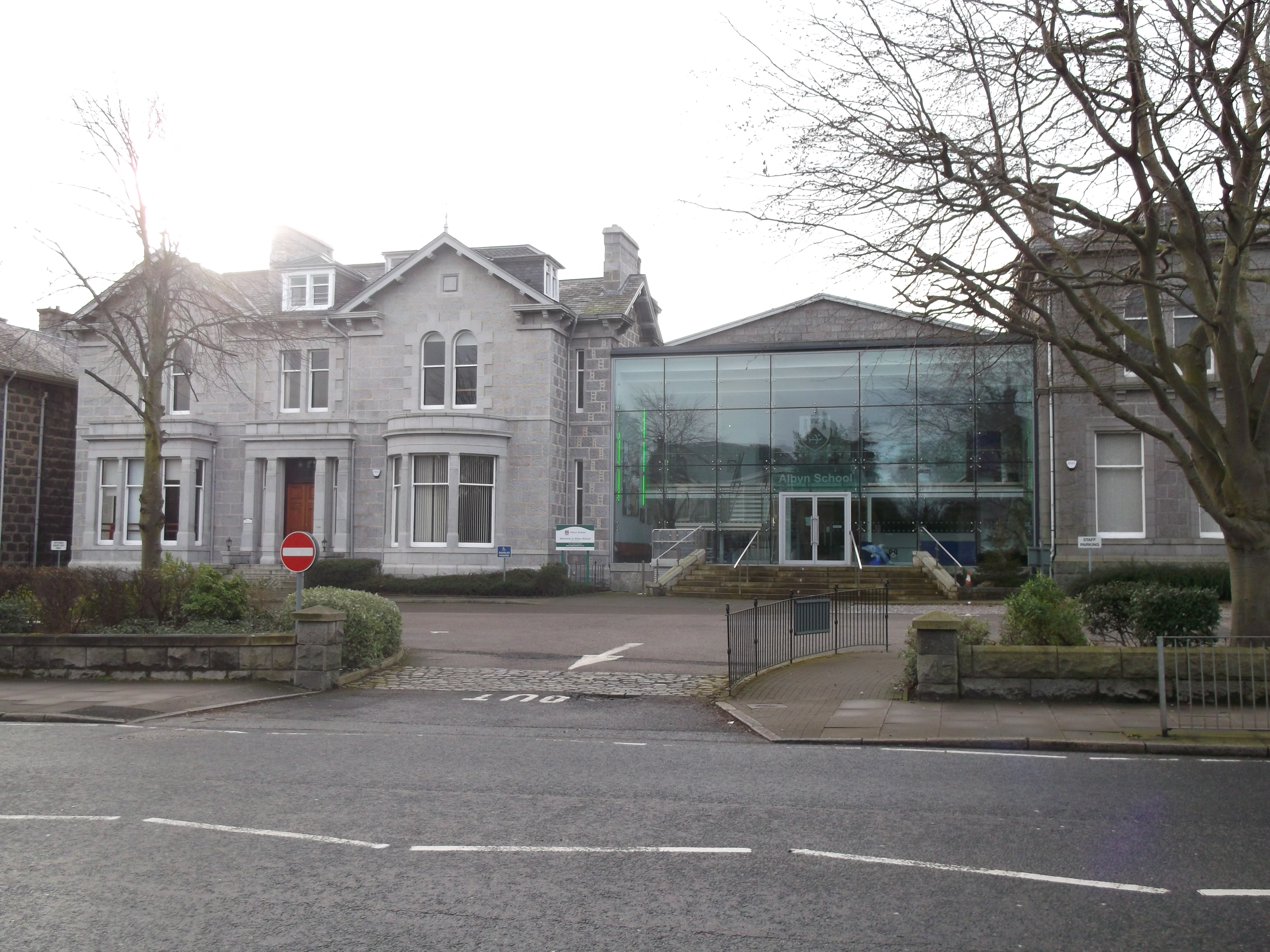
- School badge Frontage of the school building

Location
- 17-23 Queen's Road; Aberdeen, Aberdeenshire, AB15 4PB; Scotland; 57.1414°N 2.1319°W

Information
- Type: Private day school
- Motto: Vigor et Juventas (Vigour and Youth)
- Established: 1867
- Founder: Harriet Warrack
- Head of School (Interim): Matthew Bartlett
- Gender: Coeducational
- Age: 2 to 18
- Enrolment: 800
- Houses: Gordon, Stuart, Douglas, Forbes
- Colour
- Website: http://www.albynschool.org

Albyn School is a coeducational private day school, founded in 1867 in Aberdeen, Scotland. Albyn was originally an all-girls school before becoming co-educational in 2005. The school has a nursery, primary school and secondary school; pupils can attend from 2 years old to 18 years old.

== History ==
=== Establishment ===
The school was founded in 1867 by Harriet Warrack as a private school for upper-middle-class girls. Following her retirement the running of the school was passed on to Alexander Mackie. In 1886 the school moved into premises at Nos 4-6 in a terrace diagonally opposite St Margaret’s School for Girls and was officially known as the Albyn Place School for Girls, but most people knew it as "Mackie's", because of the reputation of principal Alexander Mackie. It was also known as the Union Place Ladies' School for a period.

=== Centenary ===
In 1967, the school celebrated its centenary. Under the direction of Headmistress Dorothy Kidd, a volume was produced outlining the school's history. For much of its history, Albyn was a boarding school and only recently became a day school.

=== Recent history ===
In 2016, the school reintroduced boarding. However, in 2021, the school announced that it would discontinue boarding again due to COVID-19 restrictions.

== Overview ==
=== Buildings ===
The building at 21 Queen's Road, the former boarding house taken over by the school in 1920, dates from 1884 and is a listed building. It was originally built as a villa for one of the owners of a paper mill. The listing notes that the "grand interior ... is remarkably complete".

Funding for expansion of the school buildings was agreed in 2011.

=== Clans (Houses) ===
- – Gordon
- – Stuart
- – Douglas
- – Forbes

=== School performance and inspections ===
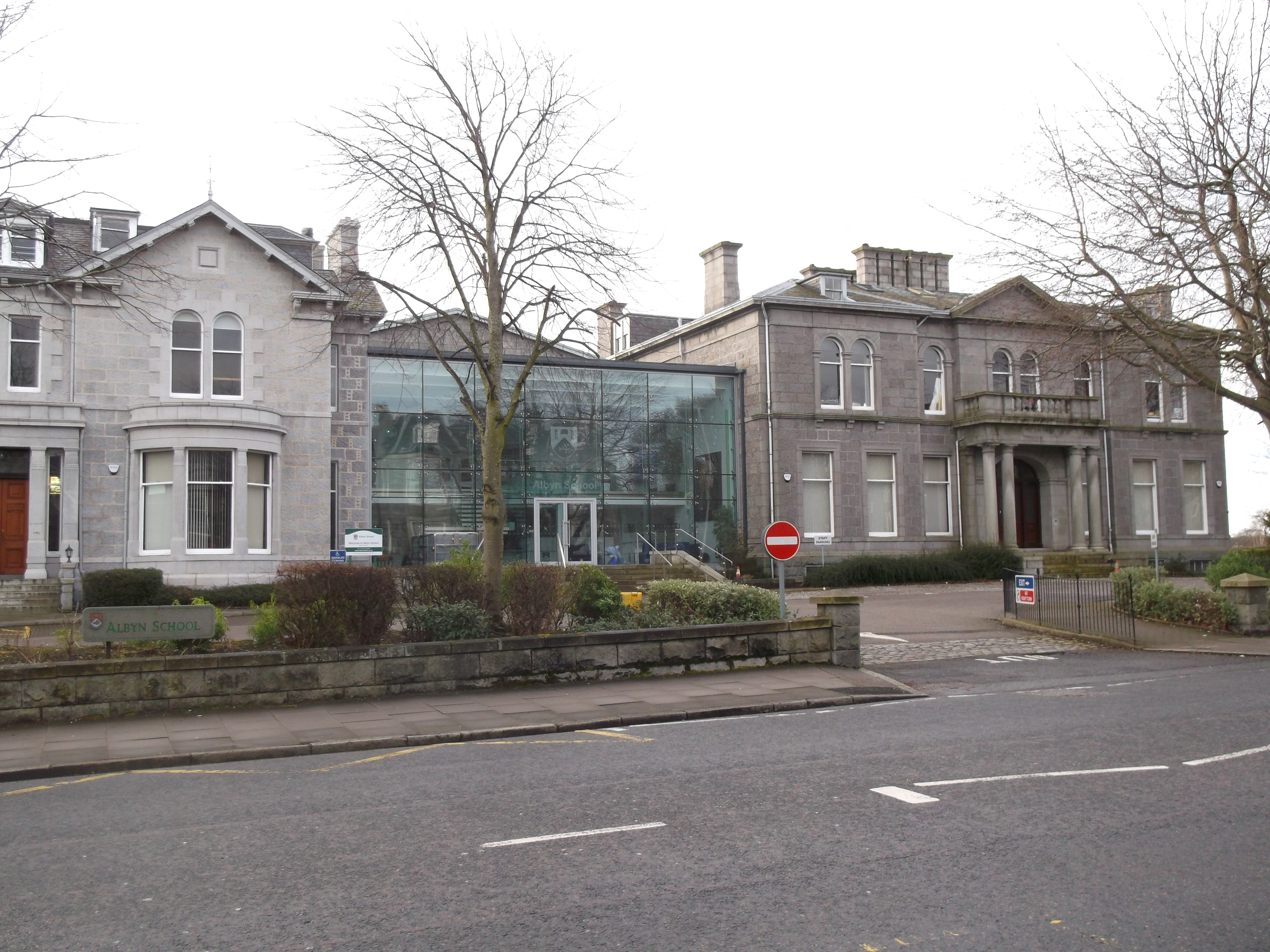
Albyn School in 2020

In 2009 and 2010 consecutively, Albyn School received the best Higher exam results among the schools in Aberdeen.

In 2015, Education Scotland inspected the school; they were critical of the school's child protection policies, governance and plans for development of leadership. They also commented that some children had recently been distressed by letters stating that they had under-performed and might not be able to continue attending.

As of 2020, Education Scotland most recently visited the school in 2016, when they found that it was continuing to improve and that achievement of and support for pupils was good.

As of 2020, the most recent inspection of the school's boarding provision by the Care Inspectorate was in 2018; the provision was graded as Very Good on all measures. The nursery provision was also inspected in 2018, and graded as Good on the two measures which were assessed.

In 2020, the school was reported as having bought more consultancy services from the Scottish Qualifications Authority to analyse pupils' work and improve grades than any other school had done.

== Charitable status ==
The school's charitable status was reviewed and confirmed in 2013 by the Scottish Charity Regulator. The report noted that "In 2012-13 the school spent 1.6% of its gross income on means-tested bursary provision; this is one of the lowest proportions of income spent on such provision which we have seen among the independent school charities reviewed so far". 16 pupils, 2.4% of the number on roll at the school, were receiving means-tested bursaries. However, it also noted that both the proportion of income spent on means-tested bursaries, and the numbers of pupils receiving bursaries, had increased for the 2013-14 year: to 5.1% of projected income, 40 pupils.

== Notable former pupils ==
- Grace McDougall, leader of the First Aid Nursing Yeomanry
- Jade Alleyne, actress
- Mary McMurtrie, artist
- Toni Shaw, British Paralympic Swimmer
