= Graeme Moodie =

British political theorist and educator

- Born: 27 August 1924; Dundee, Scotland
- Died: 3 August 2007 (aged 82); York, England
- Known for: Student governance, South African studies
- Scientific career
- Fields: Politics
- Workplaces: Keble College, Oxford; St Andrews University; Glasgow University; University of York

Graeme Cochrane Moodie (27 August 1924 – 3 August 2007) was the founding professor in 1963 of the Department of Politics at the University of York. He is most notable as principal author of The Moodie Report, which set out what is now the general model for student participation in the governance of modern British universities, and The Government of Great Britain (1961), regarded as a classic in its field and a standard textbook for students of British politics.

== Early life and education ==
Born in Dundee, the son of an ophthalmologist, and educated at Lathallan School in Fife, Moodie contracted polio at the age of nine (which left him with a lifelong limp) and was taught in hospital until 1936. His schooling was completed at the well-known Quaker school, Leighton Park near Reading, Berkshire and he then studied economics and political science at St Andrews University. While studying at The Queen's College, Oxford, he was elected president of the Junior Common Room and the University Liberal Club. In 1946 he obtained a first-class honours degree in Philosophy, Politics, and Economics.

== Academic career ==
Moodie spent a year after graduating as an external tutor in politics at Keble College, Oxford and then returned to St Andrews University as a lecturer in political science. Between 1949 and 1951 he was a Commonwealth Fund fellow at Princeton University, and in 1953 returned to St Andrews as senior lecturer in politics, spending a further year (1962–1963) at Princeton. He pursued his interest in politics outside academia, standing as the Labour Party candidate for Dumfriesshire in the 1959 general election, and gathering 42% of the vote.

Moodie became the first professor of politics and head of department at the newly founded University of York in 1963, where he remained until his retirement in 1980. During this time, he helped to establish the university's Centre for Southern African Studies, and continued work in this field after his retirement, researching post-apartheid academia and particularly academic freedom. In 1991 he was a visiting professor at the University of the Witwatersrand.

== Principal works ==
In 1959 Moodie wrote the influential Fabian pamphlet The Universities: A Royal Commission?, which set out a framework for the governance of Britain's newest universities. As a former student, Haleh Afshar wrote,

Notions of transparency in decision-making were, thanks to him, always part of York. Crucially, in 1968, at the peak of the 1960s radicalism, he chaired the staff-student committee on the place of students in the university.

His 1961 work, The Government of Great Britain, became a standard university textbook for students of politics. Later works include Opinions, Publics and Pressure Groups (1970) and Power and Authority in British Universities (1974) formed educational thinking in the 1970s and argued for less authoritarian structures, including student participation in university governance, which has now become the norm.

== Other appointments ==
- Chairman & Vice-president, Political Studies Association of the UK
- Chairman of the Society for Research in Higher Education
- 1970 - 1977, Provost, Langwith College, University of York
- 1986 & 1993, visiting professor at University of California, Berkeley
- 1981 - 84, Deputy Vice-Chancellor, University of York

== Personal life ==
Graeme Moodie and Kate Cremin (d.1985) married in 1956, having a daughter (Herald), two sons (Dan and Mark) and a stepdaughter (Jenny); after a short-lived second marriage, he married Andréa Russell in 1997. He was also a keen photographer and chairman of the Village Trust for Heslington, the village adjacent to the University of York and in which he lived.
