= Learning and Teaching Scotland =

Scottish government non-public body

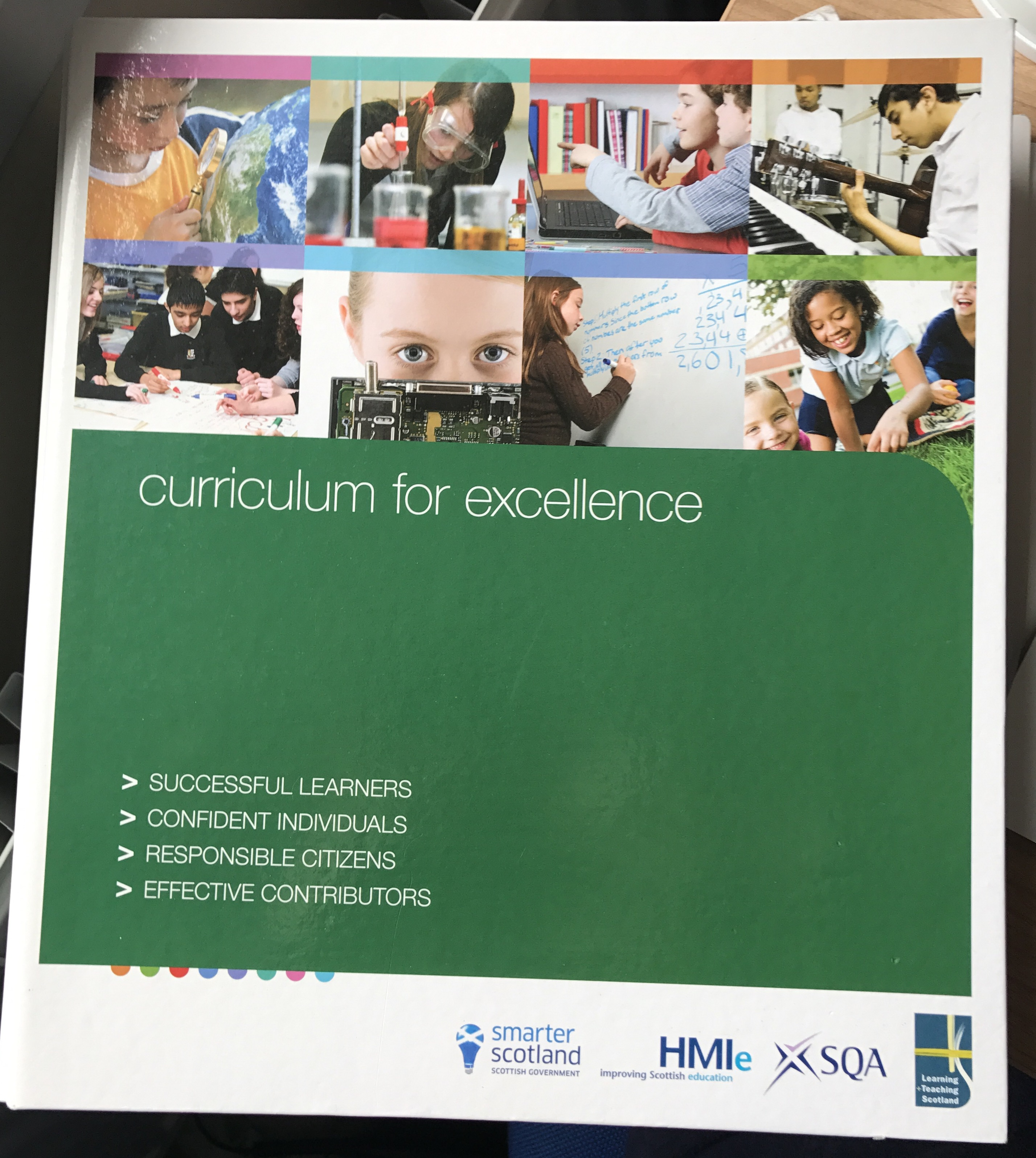
Curriculum for Excellence Green Folder

Learning and Teaching Scotland (LTS or LT Scotland) was a non-departmental public body of the Scottish Government, formed in 2000 by the merger of the Scottish Consultative Council on the Curriculum (SCCC) and the Scottish Council for Educational Technology (SCET). It was the main organisation for the development and support of the Scottish curriculum, and was at the heart of developments in Scottish education until its merger with Her Majesty's Inspectorate for Education to form Education Scotland in 2011.

The role of LTS was to provide advice, support, resources and staff development to enhance the quality of learning and teaching in Scotland, combining expertise in the curriculum 3–18 with advice on the use of ICT in education.

== History ==
LTS worked in close partnership with the Scottish Government, Her Majesty's Inspectorate of Education, the Scottish Qualifications Authority, the Association of Directors of Education in Scotland, the Convention of Scottish Local Authorities, education authorities, schools and with a range of professional associations, playing a key role in the drive to improve learning and teaching.

LTS provided support for people working in the Scottish state education system—including ministers, local authorities, school managers, teachers, and support staff—and was accountable to the Scottish Executive Education Department.

LTS operated the LT Scotland Online Service, the successor to the National Grid for Learning in Scotland. It also ran a professional development programme known as Masterclass, and a range of supported online communities of practice including Heads Together.

LTS managed Glow, a national intranet for schools and practitioners, offering a range of teaching, learning and collaborative tools across the Web, in a secure and fully authenticated way—bringing together more than 700,000 students, 50,000 teachers, all lecturers and students in initial teacher education and many others across the country.

LTS had been charged with leading the development of Scotland's 'Curriculum for Excellence' programme. The purpose of the programme is to improve the learning, attainment and achievement of children and young people in Scotland. It is also about ensuring that pupils achieve on a broad front, not just in terms of examinations.

LTS also led the innovative Assessment is for Learning programme in Scotland.

On 14 October 2010, Cabinet Secretary for Education Mike Russell announced that Learning and Teaching Scotland would be subsumed, along with Her Majesty's Inspectorate of Education into a new body named the Scottish Education Quality and Improvement Agency. This was later renamed to Education Scotland.
