= Harriet Warrack =

British school founder and Headmistress

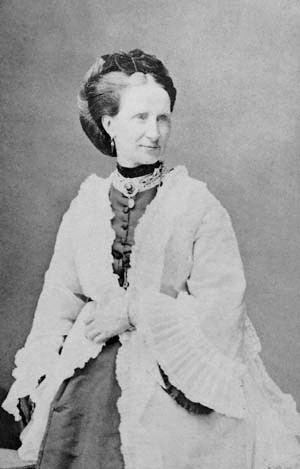
- photo by George Washington Wilson
- Born: 14 December 1825; Aberdeen
- Died: 23 April 1910 (aged 84); Aberdeen
- Education: unclear
- Occupation: headteacher
- Known for: founding and leading Albyn School in Aberdeen
- Successor: Alexander Mackie

Harriet Warrack (14 December 1825 – 23 April 1910) was a British school founder and Headmistress of Albyn School. The school was the largest academic school for girls in Aberdeen and she inspired her students to include a university degree in their ambitions.

== Life ==
It is most likely that Warrack was born in 1825 as she was baptised that year in Aberdeen; 14 December 1825 is given as her date of birth on her gravestone in the Allenvale Cemetery. Her parents were Harriet (née Morren) and James Warrack. Her father was a well known business person, grocer and tea merchant. The details of her good education are unknown but three of her four brothers went to Aberdeen Grammar School.

Warrack started in education in 1867 when she organised lessons for girls in Latin, English, languages, piano and singing in Aberdeen. This enterprise would become the school that is now called Albyn School. The school moved within two years as it fulfilled a need for girls' education recognised by the Aberdeen Ladies' Educational Association. This was formed in 1877. It was at first called the Union Place Girls School and another early name was Albyn Place Girls School that it took after it moved again in 1886.

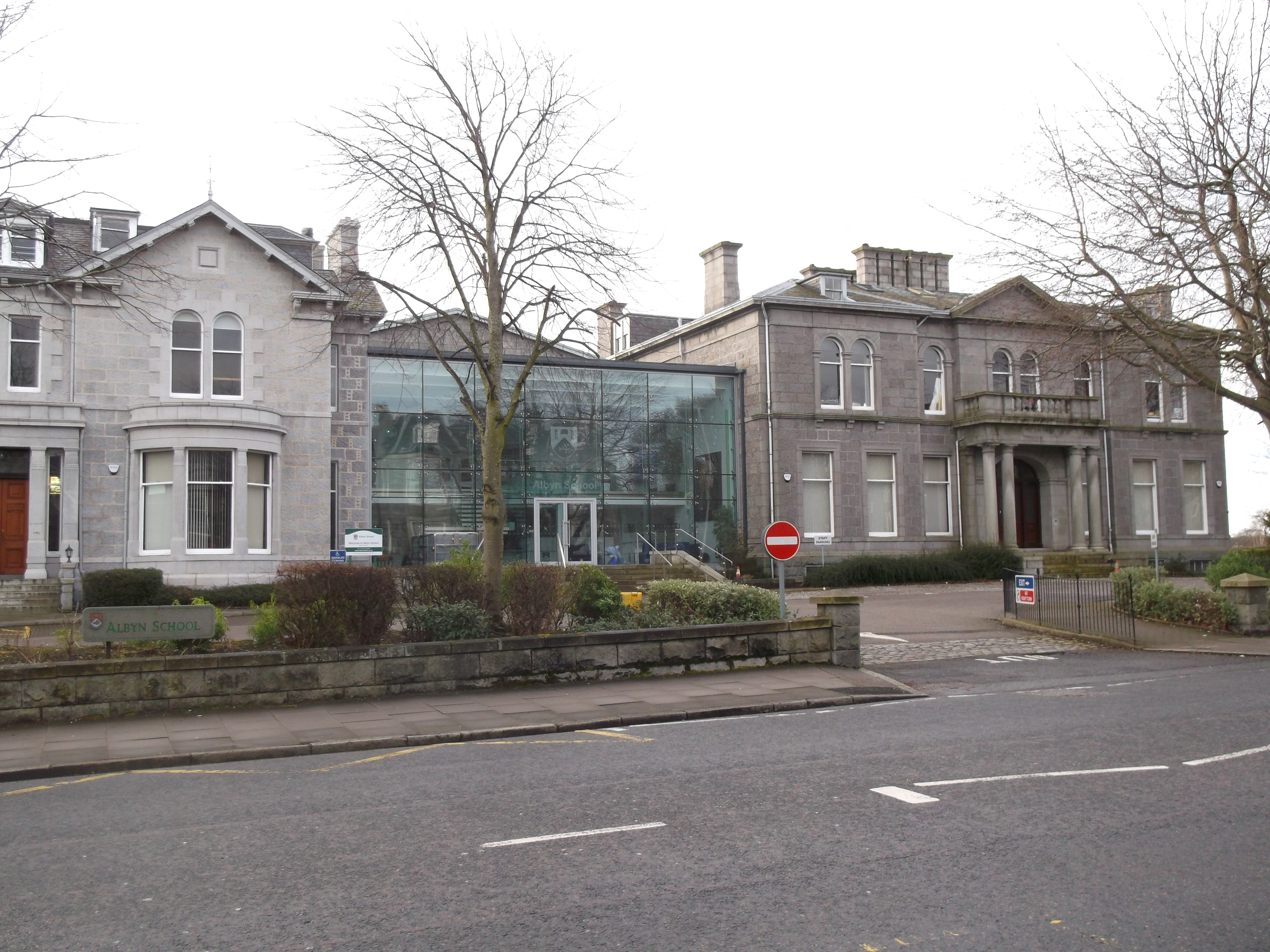
Albyn School in 2020 is co-ed, but still a private school

She was ambitious for her school and her students. In the 1870s when only a few women in the country were studying for degrees she persuaded some of her students to sit university local examinations. She held exams every three months and she would publish the best examples of their work. She was recognised for choosing good staff and in particular Alexander Mackie. He had only been at the school for six years when she retired in 1886 and left him in charge as her successor. Her school came to be nicknamed "Mackies" by later students.

Warrack was a regular church goer died in Aberdeen in 1910. A brass plaque in Aberdeen Sculpture Gallery records her support.
