= Lathallan School =

Scottish independent school

Coordinates: 56.8004°N 2.3248°W

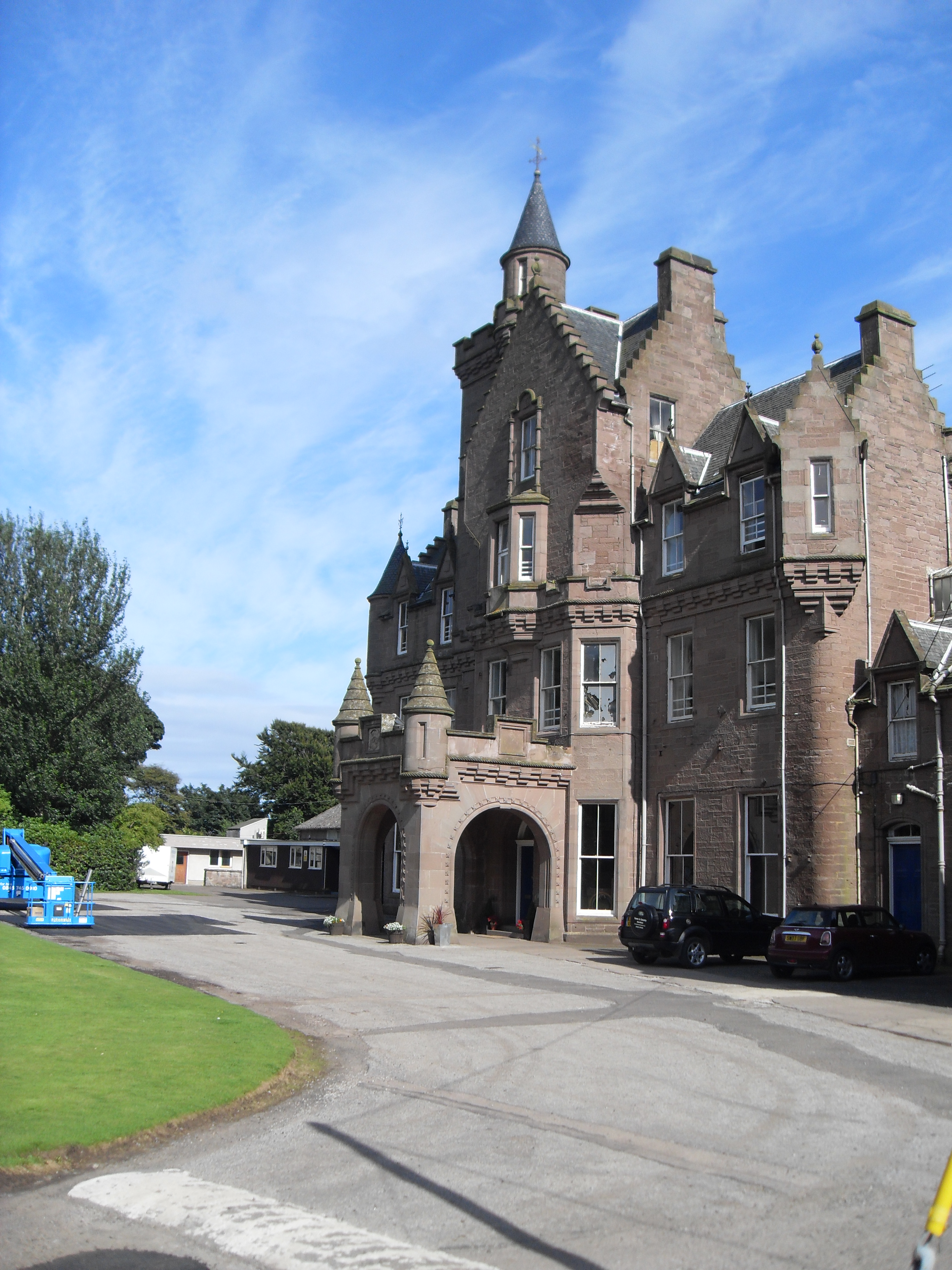
- School badge Brotherton Castle

Location
- Brotherton Castle; Johnshaven; Montrose, Angus, DD10 0HN; Scotland

Information
- School type: Private, all-through day and boarding
- Motto: Vincit qui se vincit (He conquers who conquers himself.)
- Established: 1930
- Headmaster: Richard Toley
- Gender: Coeducational
- Age: 6 weeks to 18 years
- Enrollment: 240
- Alumni: Old Lathallians

Lathallan School is a co-educational all-through private school at Brotherton Castle in Scotland. It also offers outdoor learning programs and an on-site farm on its 60-acre campus.

== History ==
Lathallan School, founded in 1930, was first located adjacent to Lathallan Farm, at Colinsburgh, south of Largoward in Fife, Scotland. Following a fire in 1949, a Lathallan student's parent, Charles Alexander, allowed the school to use Brotherton Castle premises at Johnshaven, Montrose, Angus. Alexander had purchased Brotherton in 1948, and he sold the castle and its grounds to the school in 1950.

Lathallan was originally a school for boys. It became co-educational in 1970, and in 2004 it began to offer nursery care and education.

In 2005, Prince Edward, Duke of Kent visited and unveiled a plaque to celebrate the school's 75th anniversary. The first senior students started in September 2006, with the senior school housed in the main castle building.

In 2024 Lathallan had approximately 248 pupils, including 25 boarders.

== Curriculum ==
Prior to 2011, the traditional prep school curriculum at Lathallan School included "Latin, classical studies and French in addition to national curriculum subjects", with elective instruction in music, art, and drama.

After Lathallan became an all-through school, in 2011 it endorsed the Scottish Government's Curriculum for Excellence. One consideration was "a need to ditch the Common Entrance Exam", a total of about ten exams.

Lathallan School opened a science centre in 2016, including "a working greenhouse laboratory for environmental science... [and] an eco-garden and outside teaching area". The school named one of the laboratories for retired faculty member Donald "Kangy" King. He had introduced the Nuffield Science syllabus at Lathallan, with inquiry-based discovery learning in the traditional subjects of physics, chemistry and biology.

=== Outdoor curriculum ===
In 2018, Lathallan opened a treehouse classroom that supports the school's outdoor curriculum. When nine-week old Oxford Sandy and Black piglets arrived at the school in 2018, they added to the farm environs that also included "...a treehouse classroom, zipwire, polytunnel, potato field and chickens". Four alpacas joined the other farm animals on the 60-acre site in 2021.

Lathallan involves students in its on-site farm as part of its sustainability goals. Many of the school's meals are 60% sourced and produced there. The school's goals include sourcing and producing meals 100% on-site; reducing food miles to create positive environmental impact; and helping students understand where food comes from.

=== Pipe band ===
Lathallan School pipe band had its origins in 1958. The band was officially established in 1964 and until 1972 it was led by Harry Stott, who had learned to play bagpipes with the King's Own Scottish Borderers in World War I.

Lathallan School pipe band opened the 2004 Scottish Parliament in Edinburgh. In 2009, the band published the CD Blaw na Gael and the cut "Highland Cathedral" (the Lathallan school song) was voted "Castaway's Favourite" on BBC Radio 4 Desert Island Discs in 2015. In 2014 the pipe band celebrated its 50th anniversary. Four Lathallan pupils were among 300 student pipers selected in 2019 to play "Highland Cathedral" on the Red Hot Chilli Pipers' Fresh Air album. The Lathallan pipe band program received a £1000 donation from the Montrose Port Authority after their performance at the 2019 opening of its North Quay.

== Athletics ==
Lathallan has hosted the annual rugby "Snowdrop Sevens" tournament since 1990, and has a history of rugby teams, dating back to the years before its move to Brotherton Castle in 1949.

Two Lathallan netball teams won national victories in 2018, as both the S2 team and the senior team won the Scottish Schools Cup finals.

== Accolades ==
- 2024 Gold Learning Outside the Classroom (LOtC) Mark
- 2021 Independent School of the Year Award
- 2021 Keep Scotland Beautiful: Lathallan School won the Green Flag Award for the fifth year in a row.
- 2018 Summarised inspection findings of Education Scotland, Practice worth sharing more widely: "The high-quality outdoor learning provision".
- 2018 The Duke of Edinburgh's Award: Lathallan School received recognition for the fourth consecutive year. More than 70 per cent of Lathallan students had enrolled in the award scheme, with a 50 per cent pass rate.

== Notable alumni ==
- Frans ten Bos - Scotland international rugby union player
- Ian Lang, Baron Lang of Monkton - Member of Parliament for Galloway, Life peer
- Doug Macdonald - Scots aviator, Topgun instructor
- Doug Mitchell - Film and television producer
- Graeme Moodie -British political theorist and educator
- Rob Wainwright - British Lions & Scotland international rugby union player

== See also ==
- List of independent schools in Scotland
