= Drumley House School =

Coordinates: 55.493417°N 4.526856°W

- Mossblown, Ayrshire, KA6 5AT; Scotland

Information
- Type: Preparatory school
- Established: 1960
- Closed: 1996
- Gender: Boys
- Age: 3 to 13

Drumley House School was a private preparatory school in Mossblown, Ayrshire, Scotland, a few miles from the town of Ayr.

Drumley House School was established in 1960. In 1995 the school announced that they would be merging with Wellington School, Ayr. The school closed its site in Mossblown in June 1996 with the Junior School of Wellington School renamed as Drumley House.

In 2013, Drumley House was demolished. As of April 2013, there is no planning consent to develop the site.

== Notable alumni ==
- John Beattie
- Desmond Swayne
