= Alexander Murray Drennan =

Scottish pathologist

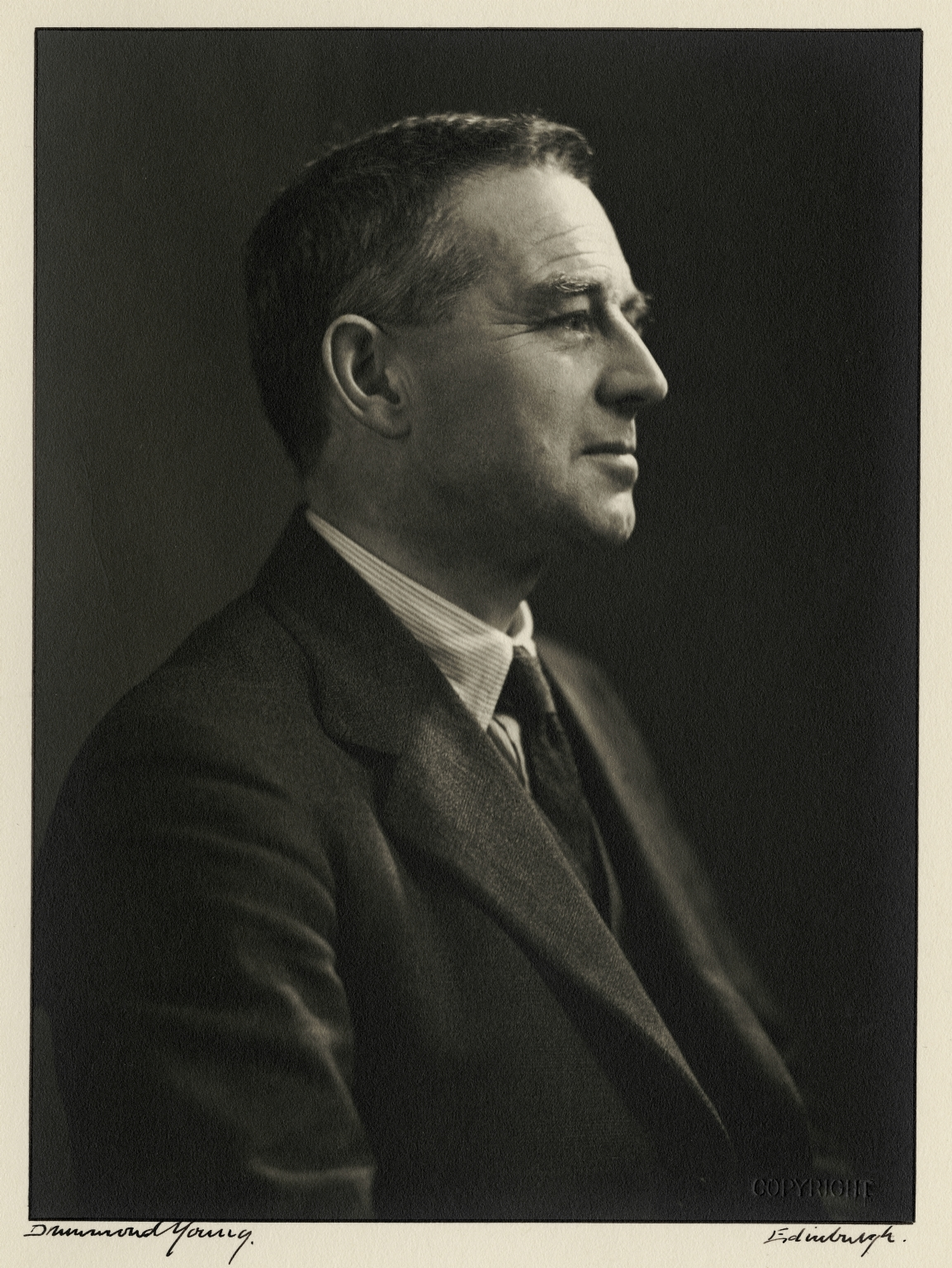
Portrait of Alexander Murray Drennan

Alexander Murray Drennan FRSE FRCPE (4 January 1884 – 29 February 1984) was a Scottish pathologist. In the First World War, he promoted the widespread use of Edinburgh University Solution (sold under the brand name of Eusol).

A keen yachtsman, he owned two yachts: Kestrel and Marishka.

== Life ==
He was born at 11.50pm on 4 January 1884 in Glasgow, the son of Margaret (née Murray) and Alexander Drennan (d.1906) of 16 Rocklea Terrace in Hillhead. His family were of Irish descent. His mother died during or shortly after his birth. The family moved to a villa (Dunalwyn) in Helensburgh while he was young and he was educated at Larchfield Academy and then back to Glasgow to attend Kelvinside Academy. He studied medicine at the University of Edinburgh graduating MB ChB in 1906, and held a place in the Residency of the Royal Infirmary of Edinburgh. On 3 April 1909 he married Marion Galbraith.

In 1914, he received a professorship at Otago University in New Zealand, but this was immediately disrupted by the onset of the First World War. He was conscripted in 1915 and joined the Royal Army Medical Corps as an official pathologist at the general military hospital at Mudros serving the Dardanelles Campaign. He was later moved to Alexandria in Egypt to serve the Mediterranean and Egyptian Expeditionary Force. He did not serve for the entire war and seems to have returned to New Zealand late in 1917 to resume his professorship. In 1924, Drennan was awarded the degree Doctor of Medicine by the University of Edinburgh for his thesis, Studies on goitre in New Zealand. He stayed in New Zealand until 1929, then took on a role as Professor at Queens University, Belfast. He only stayed there two years, then returned to the University of Edinburgh as Professor of Pathology.

In 1932, he was elected a Fellow of the Royal Society of Edinburgh. His proposers were Edward Albert Sharpey-Schafer, Thomas Jones Mackie, William Alexander Bain and Philip Eggleton. He was elected a member of the Aesculapian Club in 1947.

He retired in 1954. He died in Stirling on 29 February 1984 a few weeks after his 100th birthday.

== Publications ==
- Aneurysms of the Larger Cerebral Vessels (1921)
- A Textbook of Pathology (1943)

== Family ==
His son Alexander James Murray Drennan also trained as a doctor and served as a lieutenant in the Royal Army Medical Corps in the Second World War.
