= Doug Macdonald =

Scots aviator, 1941-2022

- Born: James Douglas Ogilvie Macdonald; 1 June 1941; Banchory, Aberdeenshire Scotland
- Died: September 3, 2022 (aged 81)
- Education: Lathallan School; Robert Gordon's College
- Known for: Air Warfare Instructor; Topgun call sign:"Haggis"
- Spouse: Faith Hulse
- Relatives: Children: Victoria and Duncan
- Aviation career
- Air force: Royal Navy Fleet Air Arm
- Rank: Commander

Doug Macdonald (1941–2022) was a Scottish aviator of the Royal Navy's Fleet Air Arm. He was a Royal Navy Observer, and became an Air Warfare Instructor, serving in the 1960's on exchange assignment with the U.S. Navy at Miramar airbase in a programme which prefaced Topgun.

== Early life and education ==
James Douglas Ogilvie Macdonald, son of Ann (née Page) and Ronald Ogilvie Macdonald, was born on 1 June 1941, in Banchory, Aberdeenshire. He attended Lathallan School and Robert Gordon's in Aberdeen. In September 1960 Macdonald went to Dartmouth for training as a naval aviation cadet. While based in Yeovilton he met Faith Hulse, his future wife. Although they divorced, they had two children, five grandchildren and two great-grandchildren.

== Career ==
At Dartmouth in September 1960 Macdonald became a naval aviation cadet to join the Fleet Air Arm (FAA) of the Royal Navy. Macdonald joined the Royal Navy Observer School (750 Naval Air Squadron) in Malta to become a naval air observer (a navigator, a non-pilot aircrew officer). In Macdonald's role as an observer, he navigated in fighter jet planes as the "eyes of the fleet". His career included postings on the aircraft carriers HMS Eagle, HMS Centaur, and HMS Victorious. He was able to return to Scotland when stationed at Lossiemouth and Leuchars.

Aboard HMS Ark Royal, Macdonald was an observer with 892 Naval Air Squadron, "a unit that was unique in British aviation history", as it was "destined to be the Fleet Air Arm's only front-line Phantom unit".

Historian Rowland White said, "...in being an Observer rather than a Pilot going through the Air Warfare Instructors' Course (AWI), Macdonald was a rarity. As a Looker he had no direct control over the aircraft, but, in having responsibility for navigation and operating the weapons system, he controlled nearly everything else."

Dick Lord, Macdonald's 764 NAS instructor at Lossiemouth,

...took the young Observer under his wing, flying as Pilot on most of Macdonald’s sorties himself. He was determined that Macdonald was going to get through. His first impression of any young aircrew he met came from the look in their eyes. Macdonald was tough and eager, his eyes were alive with the spark Lord was looking for. Much more than the Pilots, Lord knew, the Lookers were completely outside their comfort zone at 764. But Macdonald thrived during his time at Lossie.

In the 1960s, Macdonald had an exchange posting with the U.S. Navy, assigned to Miramar airbase in California, among a dozen elite aviators, all graduates of Lossiemouth's Air Warfare Instructors school of the Royal Navy's Fleet Air Arm. American pilots in Phantom jets had been losing dogfights with Vietnamese MiG 21s.

According to White:

An exchange programme between the Royal Navy and US Navy had existed for many years. But from 1964 onwards, in advance of the Phantom's introduction into Royal Navy service, small numbers of experienced FAA Pilots and Observers were sent to Naval Air Station Miramar in California, where they flew as instructors on VF-121, the US Navy Fleet's Replacement Air Group, or RAG. At 'Fightertown, USA' the Brits helped train rookie crews in the rudiments of flying and fighting the F-4 before these students were posted to front-line squadrons.

White said, "Through the instructors on exchange at Miramar the AWI's methods made their way into perhaps the most well-known programme in the history of naval aviation: Topgun." White described Macdonald as "...Air Warfare Instructor, Dougal Macdonald, a Scot with his own reputation for hard-nosed belligerence in the air".

Years later, after watching the film Top Gun Macdonald said, "The flying scenes in Top Gun were very well done. The Americans really did have call signs like Tom Cruise's, but the British lads had more of a sense of humour – my call sign was Haggis."

In 1985, after returning from the U.S., Macdonald achieved the rank of commander, and he served at Portland, Cornwall, Weymouth and in the Ministry of Defence offices in London. He retired to Bath in 1989.

Macdonald served as a committee member of the Fleet Air Arm Officers Association, 1987–1996, and then he was the administrative director until 2008. As Rowland White researched Phoenix Squadron, he credited Macdonald as "tireless and inventive in his efforts to help me reach the people I needed to speak to" for interviews.

Doug Macdonald died at home on 3 September 2022. His survivors included "siblings Elizabeth and Gavin, his children, grandchildren, great-grandchildren and partner of many years Joy Berthoud".

== See also ==
- Aerial warfare
- Naval aviation
- Navy Command (Royal Navy)
