= John Edwin MacKenzie =

Scottish chemist

John Edwin MacKenzie FRSE OBE (1868-1955) was a Scottish chemist.

== Life ==
He was born in Helensburgh on 31 August 1868. He was educated at Larchfield Academy in Helensburgh, where his father was headmaster.

He studied chemistry at the University of Edinburgh to doctorate level. This included a period of research with Professor Fittig in Strasburg. In 1894 he became Assistant Professor of Chemistry at Heriot-Watt College. In 1897 he moved to Birkbeck College in London as Head of Chemistry. MacKenzie received his DSc from the University of Edinburgh in 1901. In 1905 he moved to Victoria Jubilee Technical Institute in Bombay, India. This did not suit him and he returned to Britain in 1907 and began lecturing at the University of Edinburgh. From 1908 to 1922 he served as a Major in the Officer Training Corps of the University.

In 1916 he was elected a Fellow of the Royal Society of Edinburgh. His proposers were Sir James Walker, Leonard Dobbin, Cargill Gilston Knott and Arthur Robinson. He served as Curator to the Society’s collections from 1939 to 1949 and as Secretary 1950 to 1953.

He retired in 1938 and died in Edinburgh on 5 February 1955.

== Publications ==
- The Sugars and their Simple Derivatives (1913)

== Family ==
He was married with two sons.
