= Wellington School, Ayr =

Coordinates: 55°27′15″N 4°38′27″W

Wellington School
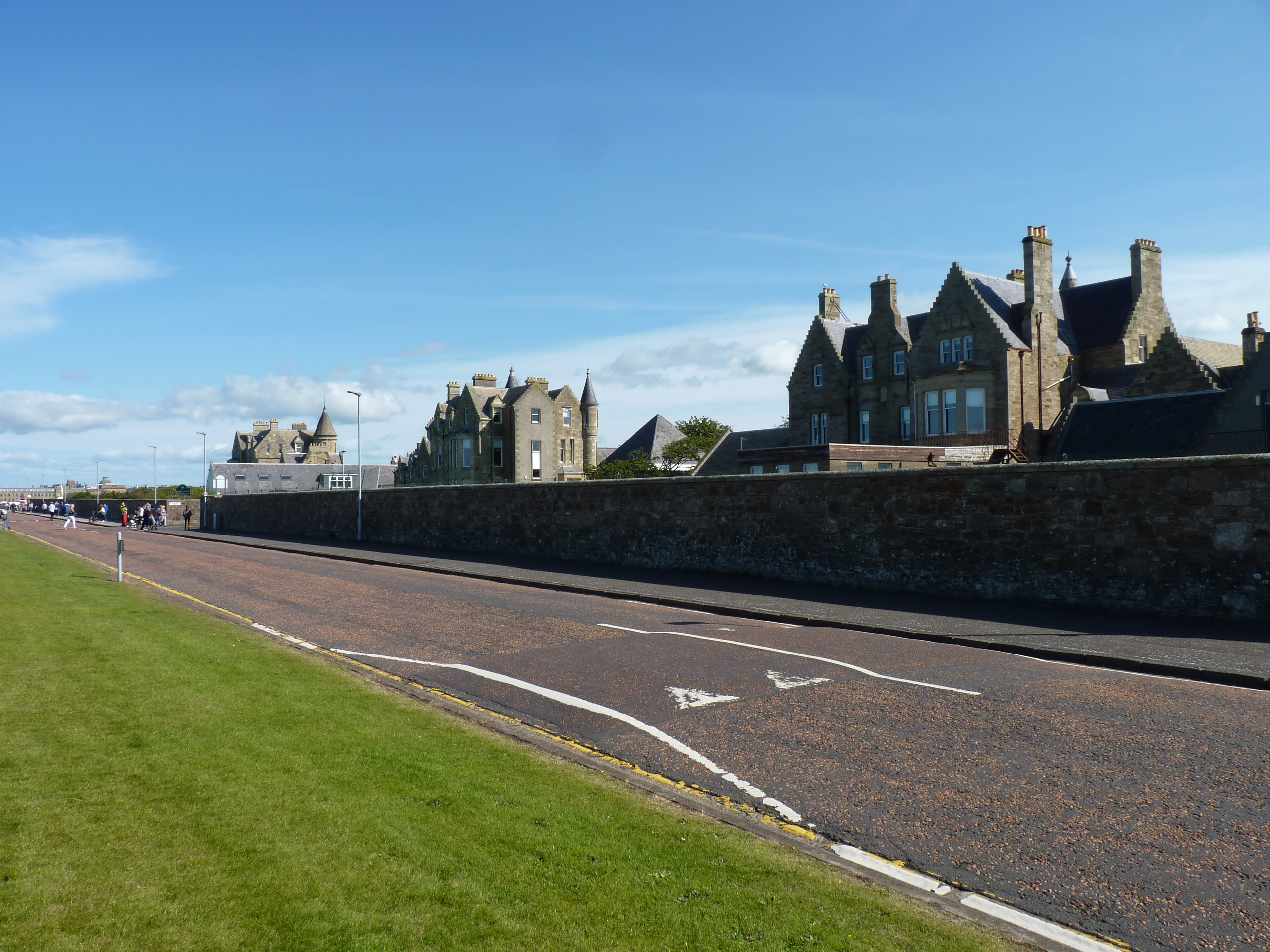
- Blackburn Drive, Ayr, with the buildings of Wellington School in the background

Location
- Craigweil Road; Ayr, South Ayrshire, KA7 2XH; Scotland

Information
- Type: Private day school
- Religious affiliation: Non-denominational Christian
- Established: 1836; 190 years ago
- Chairman: J Simpson
- Head of School: D. Gallacher
- Gender: Co-educational
- Age: 3 to 18
- Houses: Churchill, Curie, Montgomery and Nightingale
- Colour: Green
- Publication: The Turret
- Website: https://wellingtonschool.org/

Wellington School is a private day school in Ayr, Scotland. The school was founded in 1836 as a school for girls, today the co-educational school provides both primary and secondary education between its Junior and Senior Schools for around 580 pupils between the ages of three and eighteen years. Wellington School generally draws its pupils from across Ayrshire.

Wellington School is a company limited by guarantee with charitable status (Scottish Charity Number SC005052), its Charitable Purpose is the Advancement of Education.

== History ==
Founded in 1836 by Mrs Gross, a French lady and wife of an Ayr Academy school master, the school took its name from Wellington Square in Ayr where it was housed. Initially twelve 'young ladies of quality' were taught French, History, Art, Music and Elocution. By the turn of the century the school was bought by Miss Smith and Miss Cay, who added an adjoining house and enhanced its academic reputation. The school left 22 Wellington Square and moved to Carleton Turrets, Seafield in 1923 when under the ownership of Miss Carter.

The school was threatened with closure in 1948, on the retirement of Miss Carter, but this was averted by the intervention of a group of parents who bought the school and later formed it into a private company limited by guarantee. Since then it has continued as an independent school. In the initial post-war period the school catered to some younger boys as well as girls. Then, during the 1960s the school expanded from Carleton Turrets, acquiring Westfield for boarders, Sleaford for juniors and Hartfield for nursery and kindergarten.

Until 1994 Wellington School remained a girls boarding and day school. Over the following fifteen years the school underwent a series of major changes including the cessation of boarding, a change to co-education and the purchase and development of new buildings and sporting facilities. In August 1996 the school merged with the Mossblown-based preparatory school Drumley House. The merged school formed the only independent school in Ayrshire, consolidated to a single campus in Ayr. The Wellington Campus now consists of three turreted buildings in a seafront location within Seafield, a residential part of the town of Ayr. The school has playing fields on the outskirts of the town.

== Campus ==
The Senior School is housed between Carlton Turrets and Craigweil House and the integrated Junior School (Nursery, Infant and Primary stages) are accommodated across Blackburn Road within Drumley House. These buildings are a series of three large adjacent villas in Craigweil Road, all executed in 1879 to a common Scottish Baronial style by the same architect, John Murdoch. They are all two-storey with an attic on an asymmetrical-plan, with single storey ancillary buildings and attic service wings:

- Drumley House, is a Category B Listed Building at 2 Westfield Road, previously known as Westfield House.
- Carlton Turrets, is a Category C Listed Building at 1 Craigweil Road.
- Craigweil House, is a Category B Listed Building at 3 Craigweil Road.

These villas have been modified and extended to create the modern school, including a series of new buildings including new teaching areas and upgraded support spaces. Design work for a new Study Centre and Library at Craigweil House was underway in 2011, with the submission of a full planning application then anticipated early in 2012. In 2015 the school acquired Craigweil Lodge, lying between Carlton Turrets and Craigweil House, securing a contiguous landholding on the west side of Craigweil Road for the Senior School.

The school has its own playing fields and pavilion at Doonside, near Alloway on the outskirts of town. The Wellington Outdoor Nursery is also based at Doonside. Opened on 1 November 2011 by Ms Angela Constance MSP, Minister for Children and Young People, it is run in partnership with South Ayrshire Council.

== School body ==
The school has a roll of 583 day pupils (272 boys, 311 girls) across an age range of 3 to 18. Of this, the Senior School 12-18 amounts to some 291 pupils (141 boys, 150 girls). The teaching staff (53 full-time, 9 part-time) is led by Simon Johnson, in post as Headmaster since 2015. He was educated at Cambridge University and Moray House; previously he held the post of Assistant Rector at the Dollar Academy.

=== Pupils’ outcomes & destinations ===
At Higher grade examinations in 2014, Senior 5 pupils achieved a pass rate of 92.6% - the A Grade pass rate of 49.3%. The Senior 6 Advanced Higher results, with 96.4% achieving grades A to C, placed the school 2nd in Scotland, taking only A to B grades this placed them 7th in the 'Top 30 Scottish Schools doing Advanced Highers for 2014'.

In total 97% of sixth form leavers go on to a degree course, some after a gap year. 9% take courses in medicine, dentistry etc., 28% in science and engineering, 23% in humanities and social sciences, 11% in law, 28% in management and accountancy.

=== Co-curricular activities ===
The school has a wide range of clubs and other activities and was awarded the British Council’s Full International School Award during 2011. Some 75% of pupils learn a musical instrument while the main team sports are hockey for girls and rugby for boys. Participation in the John Muir Award, the Duke of Edinburgh’s Award and foreign trips and exchanges is encouraged. The school's debate team established the annual Ayrshire Debating Cup in 2023 - currently the only nationwide school-run debating competition for all senior year groups in Scotland.

=== HMIE ===
The most recent HMIE inspection was in September 2010. At this time for the school they assessed Improvements in performance, Learners experiences and Meeting learning needs all at the Very Good level. HMIE noted two particular strengths: The High levels of attainment and impressive breadth of achievement on the part of children and young people and The quality of support for learners with additional needs and the very good progress made by them.

=== Office of the Scottish Charity Regulator ===
In May 2013 the Office of the Scottish Charity Regulator inquiry report determined that the school had failed the charity test and directed them to ensure they passed it by increasing its spend on means-tested assistance by 31 October 2014. The same report acknowledged the school provided a significant level of benefit for which it makes little or no charge. However, this activity, combined with the low expenditure on means-tested bursary support, was not substantial enough to mitigate the level of fees charged. At the start of May 2014 OSCR announced its revised decision on the charitable status of a fee-charging school, confirming that it had now met the charity test in part through a higher expenditure on means-tested bursary support. Wellington School retained its charitable status.

== Notable former pupils ==
- John Beattie, rugby player and broadcaster
- Nicola Benedetti, musician
- Nigel Biggar, Anglican priest and theologian
- Kirsty Hume, model
- Rhona Simpson, field hockey player
- Desmond Swayne, politician
- Kirsty Wark, journalist and television presenter

Note all these former pupils attended either Drumley House or Wellington School, prior to their merger in 1996 that formed the current school.
