= Desmond Swayne =

British politician (born 1956)

The Right Honourable Major Sir Desmond Swayne TD VR MP
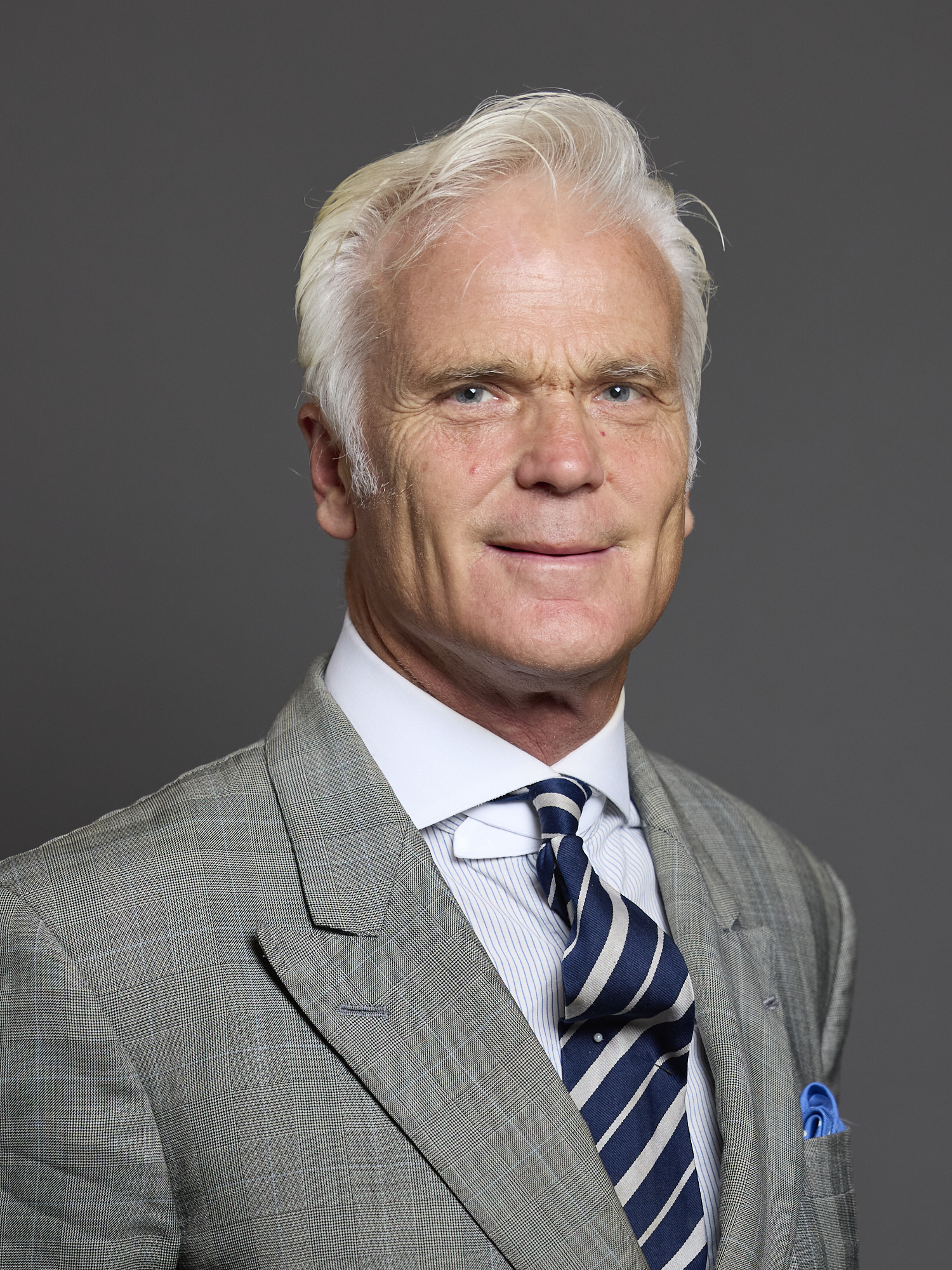
- Official portrait, 2024

Minister of State for International Development
- In office 14 July 2014 – 17 July 2016
- Prime Minister: David Cameron; Theresa May
- Preceded by: Alan Duncan
- Succeeded by: Rory Stewart

Vice-Chamberlain of the Household
- In office 7 October 2013 – 14 July 2014
- Prime Minister: David Cameron
- Preceded by: Greg Knight
- Succeeded by: Anne Milton

Lord Commissioner of the Treasury
- In office 4 September 2012 – 7 October 2013
- Prime Minister: David Cameron
- Preceded by: Michael Fabricant
- Succeeded by: Sam Gyimah

Parliamentary Private Secretary to the Prime Minister
- In office 12 May 2010 – 4 September 2012
- Prime Minister: David Cameron
- Preceded by: Jon Trickett; Anne Snelgrove
- Succeeded by: Sam Gyimah

Member of Parliament for New Forest West
- Incumbent
- Assumed office 1 May 1997
- Preceded by: Constituency established
- Majority: 5,600 (12.1%)

Personal details
- Born: Desmond Angus Swayne; 20 August 1956 (age 70) Bern, Switzerland
- Party: Conservative
- Spouse: Moira Cecily Teek (m. 1987)
- Children: Three
- Education: University of St Andrews
- Occupation: Politician
- Awards: Territorial Decoration; Iraq Medal; Queen Elizabeth II Golden Jubilee Medal; Queen Elizabeth II Diamond Jubilee Medal; Volunteer Reserve Service Medal
- Website: desmondswaynemp.com

Military service
- Allegiance: United Kingdom
- Branch/service: British Territorial Army
- Years of service: 1978–present
- Rank: Major
- Unit: Royal Mercian and Lancastrian Yeomanry

Sir Desmond Angus Swayne TD VR (born 20 August 1956) is a British Conservative Party politician who has been the Member of Parliament for New Forest West since 1997.

Before going into politics, Swayne was a teacher, and then a manager at the Royal Bank of Scotland. He was Parliamentary Private Secretary to David Cameron, during Cameron's time as Leader of the Opposition, 2005–10, and then for two years while he was Prime Minister, 2010–12. In September 2012 he was appointed as Lord Commissioner of HM Treasury and in July 2014 as Minister for International Development. Swayne was knighted in the 2016 Birthday Honours for political and parliamentary services.

He was a supporter of the Eurosceptic pressure group Leave Means Leave. He is also a prominent critic of the British government response to the COVID-19 pandemic.

== Early life and career ==
Desmond Swayne was born on 20 August 1956 in Bern, the capital of Switzerland, to George Joseph and Elizabeth McAlister Swayne (née Gibson). He was privately educated at Drumley House Preparatory School at Mossblown in South Ayrshire and Bedford School. He studied theology at St Mary's College at the University of St Andrews.

Swayne taught economics at Charterhouse School for one year followed by seven years at Wrekin College (both independent boarding schools). On 22 November 1986, as a prospective parliamentary candidate for a South Wales constituency, he was quoted in the Western Mail saying that "the surest way to protect the public from AIDS is to outlaw homosexuality and lock up offenders". From 1987 to 1997, he was a computer systems manager at Royal Bank of Scotland.

=== Military career ===
On 2 August 1987, Swayne was commissioned into the Royal Armoured Corps, Territorial Army in the rank of second lieutenant (on probation). He served with the Queen's Own Mercian Yeomanry. He was promoted to lieutenant on 2 August 1989, and to captain on 1 August 1992. On 1 November 1992, Swayne transferred to the newly formed Royal Mercian and Lancastrian Yeomanry. He was promoted to major on 14 December 1996 with seniority from 1 January 1996.

In 2003, he was called up and posted to Iraq as part of the Iraq War. He served for six months before returning to the House of Commons.

== Parliamentary career ==
At the 1987 general election, Swayne stood as the Conservative Party candidate in Pontypridd, coming second with 19.5% of the vote behind the incumbent Labour MP Brynmor John.

Swayne again stood for Parliament at the 1992 general election in West Bromwich West, coming second with 35.5% of the vote behind the incumbent Labour MP Betty Boothroyd.

Swayne was elected to Parliament as MP for New Forest West at the 1997 general election with 50.6% of the vote and a majority of 11,332. In the subsequent Conservative Party leadership election, Swayne supported Michael Howard, and later John Redwood.

From 1997 to 2001, he held shadow ministerial portfolios for Northern Ireland, health and defence and as a senior opposition whip. In September 2004, Swayne was appointed Parliamentary Private Secretary to the Leader of the Opposition.

At the 2001 general election, Swayne was re-elected as MP for New Forest West with an increased vote share of 55.7% and an increased majority of 13,191. He was again re-elected at the 2005 general election with an increased vote share of 56.4% and an increased majority of 17,285.

Following the election of David Cameron as leader of the Conservative Party in December 2005, Swayne was appointed as his PPS. In 2006, a series of Swayne's e-mails to Cameron with unflattering descriptions of fellow Conservatives was leaked to the media.

As a result of the expenses scandal, Swayne repaid the £6,131 that he claimed for a new kitchen at his second-home flat in North Kensington in 2006, and £60.66 over claimed for a water bill. Swayne employs his wife Moira as part-time Executive Secretary/Office Manager. Swayne provided a full breakdown of his expenses on his website, and was found by local media in South Dorset to be the lowest claiming of the local MP expenses' league table, after claiming £94,754 expenses in 2007/08, compared with £91,737 in 2006/07.

In addition to his salary as an MP, in 2009 Swayne reportedly earned £12,000 a year as a director of property development firm Lewis Charles Sofia Property Fund, which predominantly specialises in holiday developments in Bulgaria; and around £5,000 in his role as a major in the Army Reserve.

At the 2010 general election, Swayne was again re-elected, with an increased vote share of 58.8% and a decreased majority of 16,896. After the election, Swayne maintained his role as a PPS in government.

On 11 June 2011, it was announced Swayne would be appointed a Privy Counsellor in the Queen's 2011 Birthday Honours List. On 13 July 2011, Swayne was duly sworn in as member of Council. In 2014, he was appointed as a minister for international development.

In the Commons he sits on the Ecclesiastical Committee (Joint Committee). He has previously sat on the International Trade Committee, the Administration Committee, the Defence Committee, the Procedure Committee, the Social Security Committee and Scottish Affairs Committee.

At the 2015 general election, Swayne was again re-elected, with an increased vote share of 59.9% and an increased majority of 20,604. He was again re-elected at the snap 2017 general election with an increased vote share of 66.8% and an increased majority of 23,431.

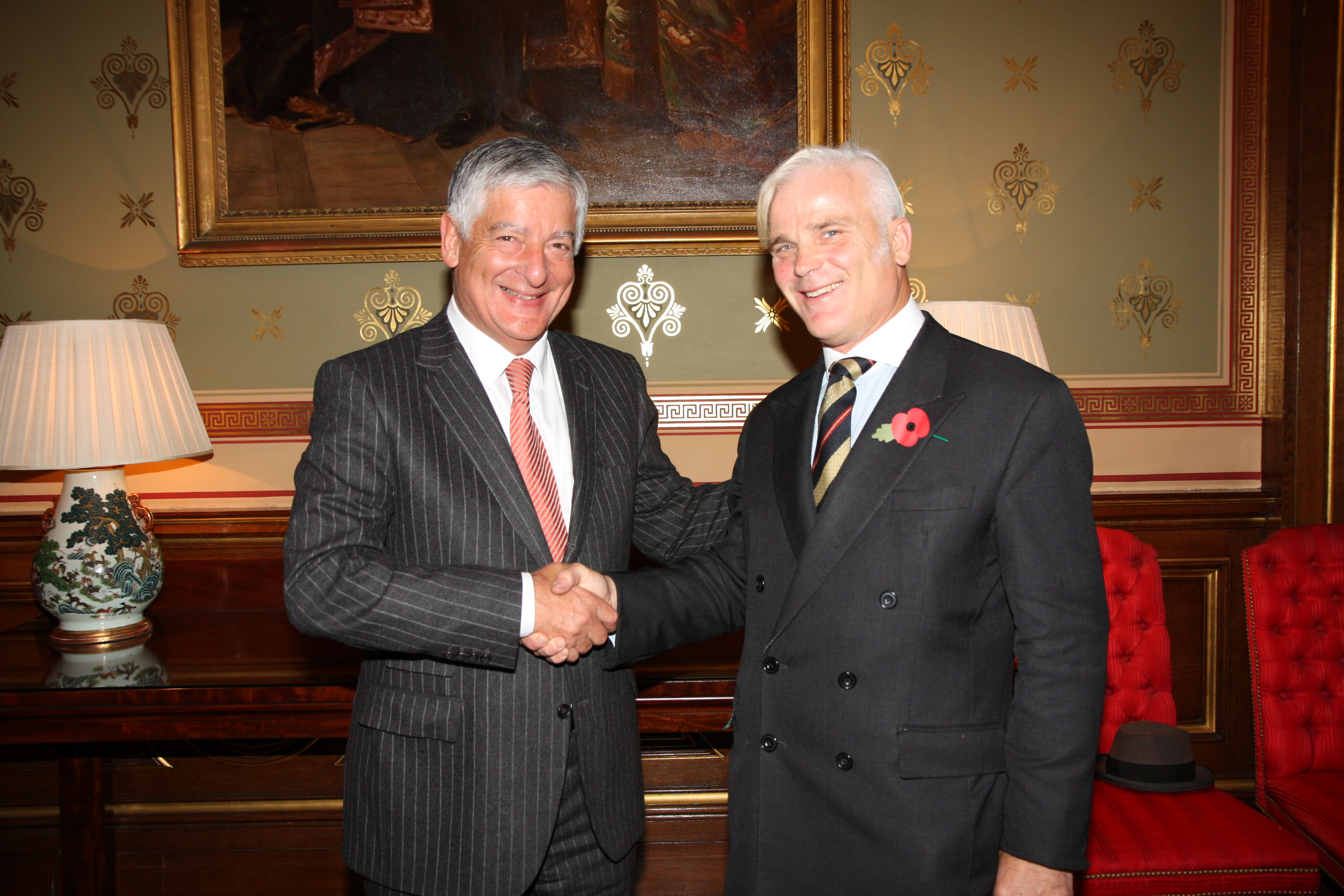
Swayne with British Red Cross Chairman David Bernstein at the 150 Years of International Humanitarian Law: The UK Perspective event in London on 29 October 2014.

On 28 September 2019, Swayne remarked that "blackface" was an "entirely acceptable bit of fun". On 30 September, it was reported that he wore blackface while attending a Blues Brothers themed party, where he was pictured posing as James Brown. Swayne said he "went to some trouble to be as authentic as possible" in creating the costume. After initially declining to apologise, Swayne later said he was sorry for any offence that he gave.

At the 2019 general election, Swayne was again re-elected, with a decreased vote share of 63.8% and an increased majority of 24,403.

During the COVID-19 pandemic, Swayne was a prominent critic of the government's lockdown measures, arguing they were disproportionate. He opposed mandatory face masks and vaccine passports, and raised concerns in Parliament about the economic impact of restrictions. In January 2021, Swayne was criticised after footage emerged of him telling anti-lockdown campaigners to "persist" and suggesting that NHS capacity figures had been "manipulated". He refused to apologise and said he supported vaccination but believed there were legitimate grounds for debate over restrictions.

On 18 August 2021, Swayne suggested in Parliament that Afghan refugees should have been joining "the resistance" against a brutal regime rather than "queuing at the airport" after the fall of Kabul.

Swayne was again re-elected at the 2024 general election, with a decreased vote share of 35.4% and a decreased majority of 5,600.

During the swearing in of Andy Burnham as MP for Makerfield on the 22nd June 2026, after the constituency's by-election on the 18th June, Swayne called in the House of Commons, "Rome is saved", in reference to Burnham's intention to stand in 2026 Labour Party leadership election.

== Personal life ==
Swayne married Moira Cecily Teek in 1987. They have one son and two daughters. He is a Christian and a member of Christians in Parliament.

== Honours and decorations ==
Swayne is a recipient of the Queen's Golden Jubilee Medal, the Iraq Medal, and the Queen's Diamond Jubilee Medal. He has also received the Territorial Decoration for 12 years' service in the Territorial Army. In June 2009, he was awarded the Volunteer Reserves Service Medal.

Swayne was knighted in the 2016 Birthday Honours for political and parliamentary service.

Parliament of the United Kingdom
New constituency	Member of Parliament for New Forest West; 1997–present	Incumbent
Political offices
Preceded by Graham Brady	Parliamentary Private Secretary to the Leader of the Opposition; 2004–2010	Succeeded by Anne McGuire
Preceded by Alan Duncan	Minister of State for International Development; 2014–2016	Succeeded by Rory Stewart
Government offices
Preceded by Jon Trickett; Anne Snelgrove	Parliamentary Private Secretary to the Prime Minister; 2010–2012	Succeeded by Sam Gyimah
