= Mossblown =

Settlement in Scotland

Coordinates: 55.4917°N 4.5278°W

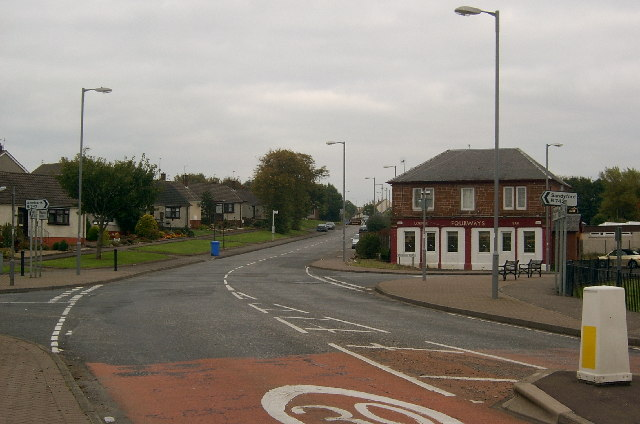
- Mossblown, Ayrshire

- Location within South Ayrshire
- Population: 2,100 (2020)
- OS grid reference: NS402248
  - Edinburgh: 61 mi (98 km)
  - London: 329 mi (529 km)
- Council area: South Ayrshire
- Lieutenancy area: Ayrshire and Arran
- Country: Scotland
- Sovereign state: United Kingdom
- Post town: AYR
- Postcode district: KA6
- Police: Scotland
- Fire: Scottish
- Ambulance: Scottish
- UK Parliament: Central Ayrshire
- Scottish Parliament: Carrick, Cumnock and Doon Valley

Mossblown is a village in South Ayrshire, Scotland. It had an estimated population of 2,100 in 2020.

== History ==
Mossblown was a coal mining community but the mines have been closed for some time now.

Until the late 1940s - early 1950s, there was a working farm located near the centre of the village, called Whiskeyhall Farm. A nearby street takes its name from this farm.

The area to the north-east of Mossblown was known as Drumley in the 1930s, 1940s and 1950s. Drumley House School takes its name from here. There was a working pit, also called Drumley, and the houses, built for the pit workers, consisted of two miners' 'rows', the 'long row' and the 'wee row' (single storey dwellings, often housing large families, nine or more, in two or three rooms). There was a community 'wash hoose' (wash house) where the wives would meet and do all their families' washing, while the husbands would work long hours down the nearby pit.

A private housing scheme was built in Mossblown's south-eastern quarter in the 1990s, adjacent to the old Annbank Church.

The north eastern boundaries of the village on the B743 road towards Tarbolton and Mauchline were extended to include a housing scheme called The Meadows.

== Transport ==
A railway which still runs through the village used to serve as the main rail link from Stranraer to London, but this route has long since been demoted from public service, and all London to Stranraer services now go via Ayr.

Until the mid-1960s, there was a railway station located in the middle of the village known as Annbank Station.

Two Stagecoach bus routes (numbers 43 + 43a) serve the village, connecting Mossblown with Ayr, Annbank, Tarbolton and New Cumnock.

== Sport ==
There are currently two amateur football teams in the village: Mossblown AFC and Drumley AFC. Both teams play in the Ayrshire Amateur league. The village is also served by a sports activity centre. Typical activities within the centre include football, badminton, short tennis, gymnastics, netball, mini-netball, basketball, volleyball, archery, aerobics, roller hockey, dance classes, circuit training and various martial arts groups. The centre comprises a main hall and a squash court. There is also a small gymnasium containing both cardiovascular and resistance equipment.

== Amenities ==
The village was served by a local library until 2017, which now lies within the grounds of Annbank Primary School.

The villages only pub, The Fourways, closed down in 2025.

Mossblown also has a primary school named Annbank Primary School, which accommodates pupils from Mossblown and Annbank. Annbank and Mossblown are in the catchment area for Ayr Academy.

Other amenities in the village include a local pharmacy and a care home for the elderly called Templehouse Nursing Home.
