= International School of Aberdeen =

International School Aberdeen
- Pitfodels House, North Deeside Road, Cults, Aberdeen, AB15 9PN

Information
- Former name: American School of Aberdeen
- Established: 1972
- Chair of the Board: Chris Sawyer
- Head of school: Nicholas Little
- Website: isa.aberdeen.sch.uk

ISA entrance, Pitfodels House, Aberdeen

ISA campus & sports facilities, Pitfodels

The International School Aberdeen (ISA) is a school in Pitfodels, Cults, Aberdeen, Scotland. It caters for students aged 3 - 18 and is made up of 60% UK nationals, and 40% international students.

It is one of five IB World Schools in Scotland that offers the IB Diploma Programme. The other four are St Leonards School, St Andrews, Lomond School, Helensburgh, Fettes College, Edinburgh and George Watson’s College, Edinburgh.

== History ==
Launched as the American School of Aberdeen in 1972, the school was based in Cults, then Milltimber. In 2010, the school moved from its campus to allow it to be demolished for construction of the Aberdeen Western Peripheral Route. Since then it has been based at Pitfodels House, where it uses the original refurbished building and a custom-designed school and sports facility.

== Facilities ==
The International School of Aberdeen offers a wide variety of facilities including spacious classrooms within two teaching wings, fully equipped science labs, visual and performing art studios, a multi level library, a 300-seat theatre plus a sports complex with a swimming pool and climbing wall.

== See also ==
International Baccalaureate
