= Morrison's Academy =

Independent school in Perth and Kinross, Scotland

Coordinates: 56.37491°N 3.84076°W

Morrison Academy
- Crieff, Perth and Kinross; Scotland

Information
- Type: Private day school
- Motto: Ad Summa Tendendum ("To Strive For The Highest")
- Established: 1860
- Rector: Andrew McGarva
- Enrollment: approx 550

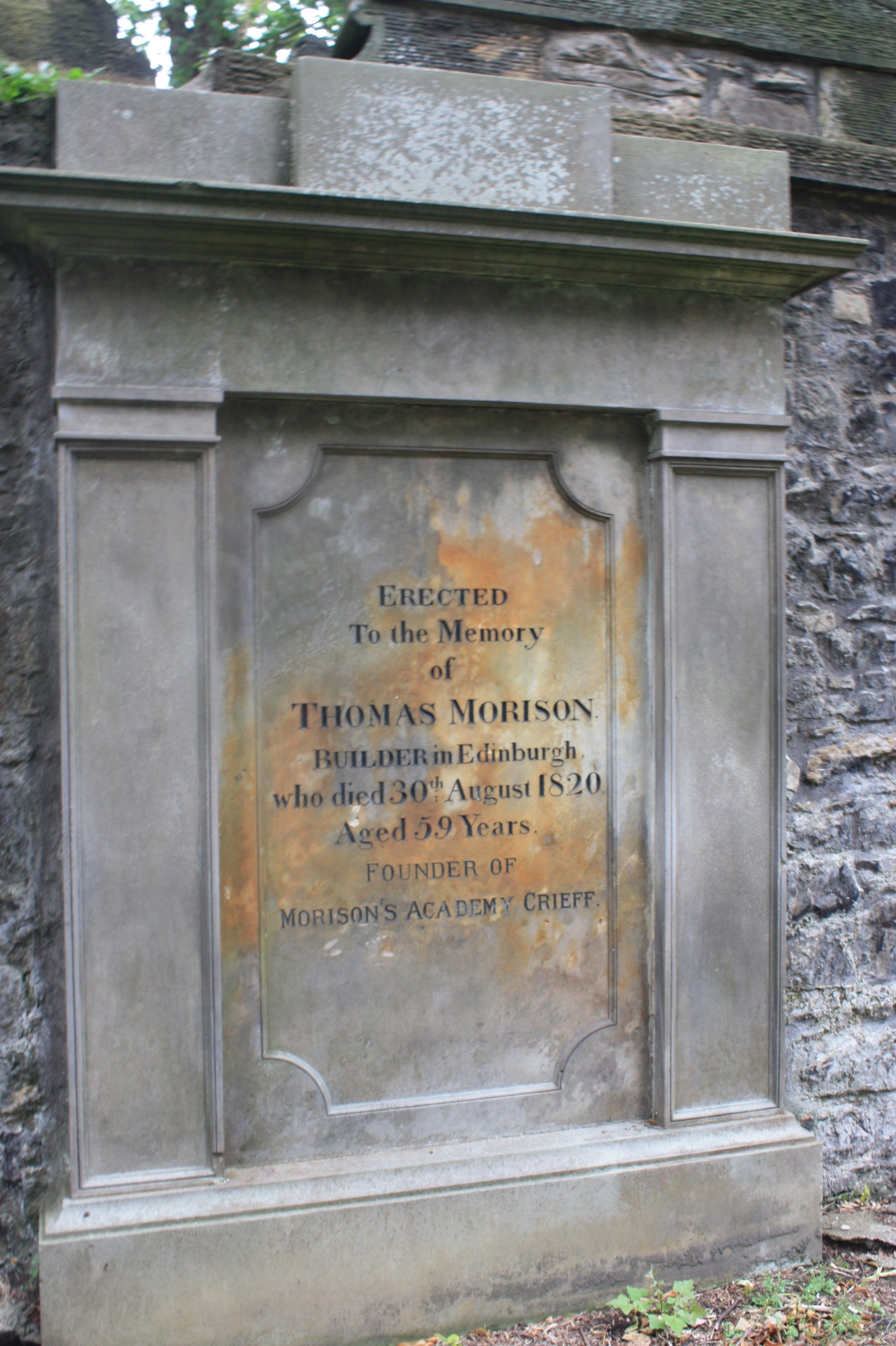
The grave of Thomas Morison, St Cuthberts, Edinburgh

Morrison's Academy is a co-educational private day school in Crieff, Perth and Kinross, in Central Scotland. The school provides nursery, primary and secondary school facilities. It draws many pupils from surrounding Perth and Kinross and Stirling.

== History ==
Morrison's Academy owes its foundation to Thomas Morison (also spelled Morrison). Born in 1761 in the village of Muthill; his mother belonged to Crieff. Morison trained as a stonemason and, after working some years in Auchterarder, he moved to Edinburgh and set up his own business. He made his fortune as the builder of a substantial part of the city's beautiful Georgian New Town (the sections north of Queen Street).

Morison died at age 59 on 30 August 1820 in Edinburgh. He had no children and, rather than letting his entire fortune fall into the hands of relatives, directed his trustees in his will to: "erect and endow an institution or institutions as to them shall appear best calculated to promote the interests of mankind, having a particular regard to the Education of youth and the diffusion of knowledge." And he continues, "although I do not wish to confine this object to a particular place, yet I have regard in my views to the part of the country where I was born, and to the city of Edinburgh, where I long resided and acquired my fortune." He finishes by saying, "I rather incline to point at a new institution which may bear my name and preserve the remembrance of my good intentions for the welfare and happiness of my fellowmen".

After years of searching for a suitable location, his trustees decided on Crieff, near to where Morison was born, rather than Edinburgh which was already well-served with schools. They purchased the old market site where the cattle tryst used to be held before it moved south to Falkirk. The school opened for business on 1 October 1860.

In 2018 Morrisons said they planned to merge with Beaconhurst School, Bridge of Allan but Beaconhurst went into administration.

In 2021 the Scottish Child Abuse Inquiry heard accusations from former pupils at Morrisons that they suffered physical abuse when they were at the school. The lawyer representing Morrisons said the most recent case was 30 years ago. He admitted that the school had failed to stop the abuse.
