= Lomond School =

School in Helensburgh, Argyll and Bute, Scotland

Location
- 10 Stafford Street; Helensburgh, Argyll and Bute, G84 9JX; Scotland
- Coordinates: 56°00′32″N 4°44′13″W

Information
- Former name: Larchfield School; Larchfield Academy; St Bride's School for Girls
- Type: Primary & Secondary; Day & Boarding School; Private School
- Motto: Latin: Prospiciamus (Let Us Look Forward)
- Established: 1977; 49 years ago
- Status: Open
- Local authority: Argyll and Bute
- School code: 8380139
- Principal: Claire Chisholm
- Gender: Co-Educational
- Age: 3 to 18
- Enrollment: ~350
- Education system: Scottish Education System; International Baccalaureate
- Houses: Bergius; Colquhoun; Graham
- Colour
- Sports: Rugby, hockey, athletics
- Website: www.lomondschool.com
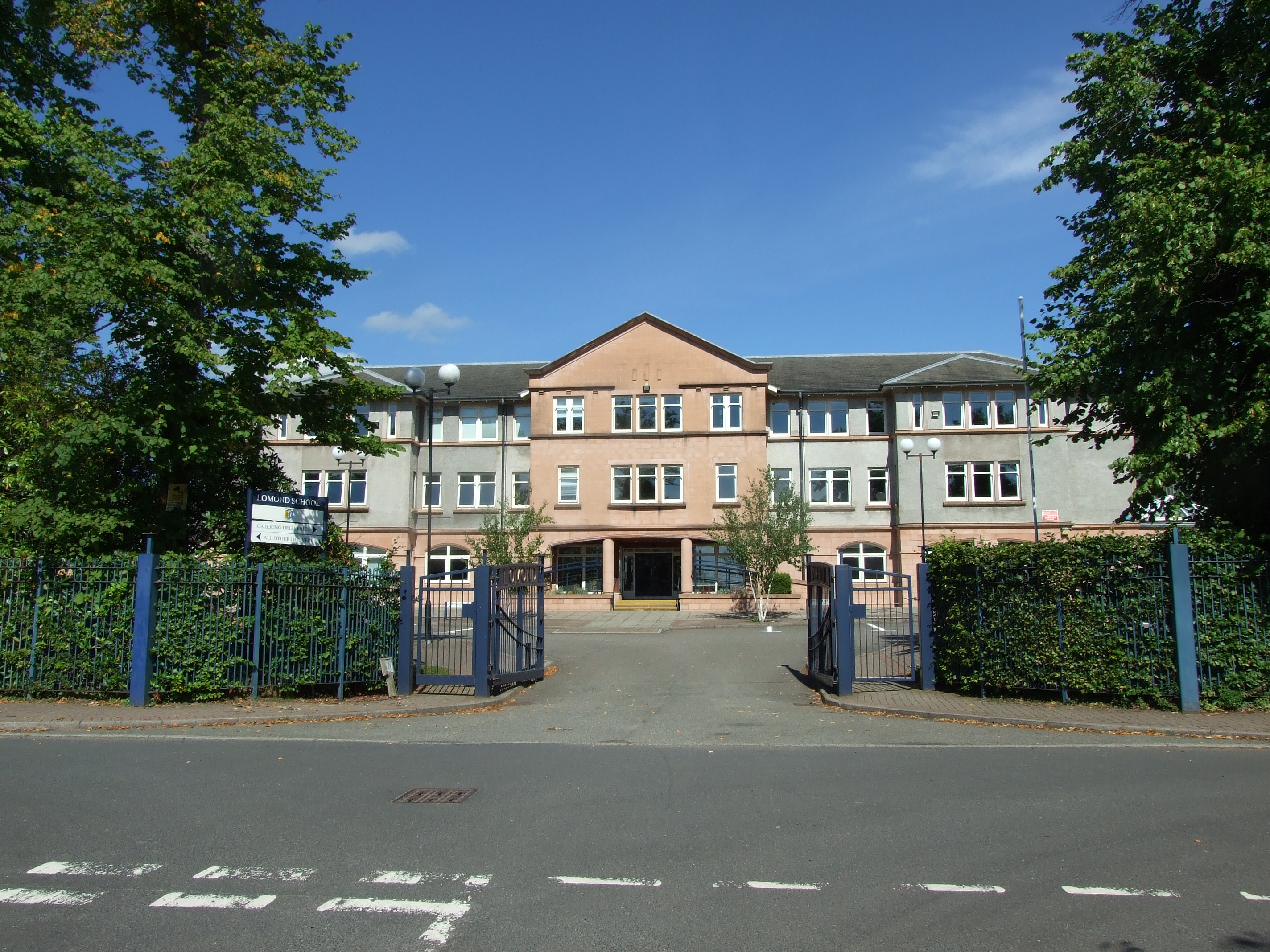
- Main building of Lomond School
- Last updated: 25 November 2022

Lomond School is a private, co-educational, day and boarding school in Helensburgh, Argyll and Bute, Scotland. Lomond School is, currently, the only day and boarding school on the west coast of Scotland. It was formed from a merger in 1977 between Larchfield School (founded 1845 and previously called Larchfield Academy) and St Bride's School for Girls (founded 1895).

Lomond School primarily teaches to the Scottish Education System, but in pupils' senior years (S5 & S6) at the school they can move into one of the International Baccalaureate programmes. The IB programmes were introduced in August 2021.

It is a member school of the Headmasters' and Headmistresses' Conference.

The principal of the school is Claire Chisholm who took over from Johanna Urquhart, in January 2024. Before Mrs Urquhart, the previous headmaster was Simon Mills.

== History ==
Lomond School was the result of a merger between Larchfield School (founded 1845 and previously called Larchfield Academy) and St Bride's School for Girls (founded 1895) in 1977.

Larchfield Academy (often called Larchfield School) was a preparatory school for boys in Colquhoun Street, Helensburgh and was founded in 1858. Larchfield Academy had existed in various forms and in other buildings prior to that, with the original year of foundation given as 1845. The old school building was purchased along with the newly-completed Larchfield Academy in 1858 by James S. Scott.

The school originally used both the Larchfield and St Brides sites. In February 1997, the St Brides building burnt down in a fire. In October 1998, a replacement building was built on the St Brides site and incorporated elements of the former building that were not destroyed by the fire. The design of the new building was completed by senior master Ian McKellar, an architect turned graphic communication teacher at Lomond, and Glasgow-based architects G D Lodge. The Larchfield site was also sold at around the same time.

== Notable former pupils ==
- John Logie Baird
- Fiona Burnet, hockey player
- Alexander Murray Drennan FRSE (1884-1984) Professor of Pathology
- James George Frazer, Scottish social anthropologist, classicist and folklorist
- Bonar Law
- Dr John Edwin MacKenzie FRSE (1868-1955) chemist
- Nicola Skrastin, hockey player
- Alexander Ure, 1st Baron Strathclyde
- John Wardlaw-Milne, Conservative MP for Kidderminster.
