= Clifton Hall School =

Independent school in Edinburgh, Scotland

Coordinates: 55°55′24.2″N 3°25′36.9″W

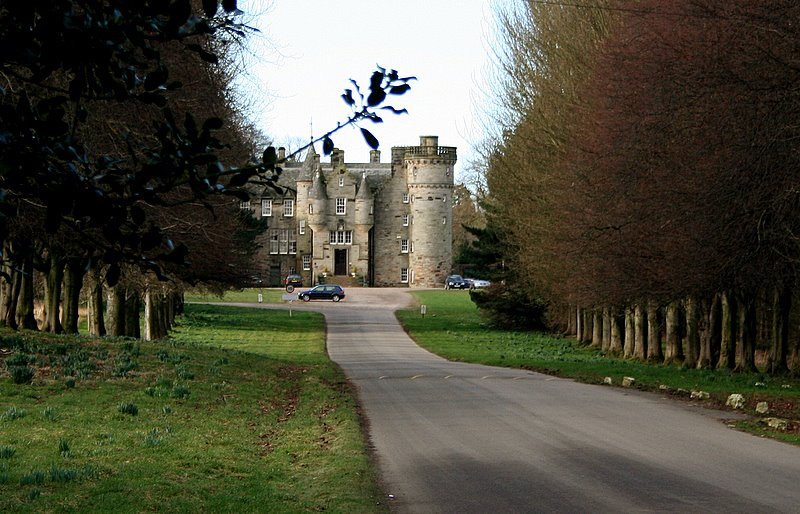
- Newbridge, Edinburgh, EH29 8LQ; Scotland

Information
- Type: Independent
- Established: 1930
- Founders: Richard Killick and Robert Ainslie
- Headteacher: Jill Drummond
- Gender: Co-educational
- Age: 3 to 18
- Enrolment: 462
- Website: http://www.cliftonhall.com/

Clifton Hall School is an independent day school located near Newbridge in Edinburgh, Scotland. It is divided into the Nursery, Junior, and Senior Schools and educates pupils from nursery to Senior 6, ages 3–18.

== Buildings ==
The school occupies a 19th-century, category A-listed building. This was constructed in 1850 to designs by David Bryce for the Maitland family, who had inherited the property in 1786. An older house, possibly from the late 16th century, forms the basis of the structure, although it was completely rebuilt in the Scottish baronial style.

== Notable alumni ==
- Rory Bremner, playwright and comedian
- Jim Clark, Formula One racing driver
- James Aikman Cochrane, historical author
- Graham Crowden, actor
- Sir David Edward, lawyer and former judge of the Court of Justice of the European Communities
- Archie Scott-Brown, racing driver
- Ewan Stewart, actor

== See also ==
- W. D. M. Bell, big game hunter, born at Clifton Hall
