= His Majesty's Inspectorate of Education =

Public body in Scotland

His Majesty's Inspectorate of Education in Scotland

Agency overview
- Formed: 2025
- Type: Inspectorate
- Jurisdiction: Scotland
- Agency executive: Ruth Binks, Chief Inspector of Education
- Parent organisation: Scottish Government
- Website: educationinspectorate.gov.scot

His Majesty's Inspectorate of Education in Scotland (HMIE) is a public body of the Scottish Government, responsible for the inspection of public, private, primary, and secondary schools, as well as further education colleges, community learning, Local Authority Education Departments and teacher education.

HMIE and Learning and Teaching Scotland were merged in 2011 to create Education Scotland. However, the body was re-established in 2025, following the passage of the Education (Scotland) Act 2025.

The head of the service is the HM Chief Inspector of Education, held since March 2026 by Ruth Binks. The Chief Inspector in appointed by the King on advice from the Scottish Government.

== History ==
The first HM Inspector of Schools (HMI) was appointed in 1840. The rationale for the first appointments of HMI linked inspection to "the improvement of elementary education" and charged HMI to say "what improvements in the apparatus and internal management of schools, in school management and discipline, and in the methods of teaching have been sanctioned by the most extensive experience". The particular focus in Scotland on combining inspection with self-evaluation has been central to the drive to raise educational standards.

HMIe was headed by Her Majesty's Senior Chief Inspector of Education. Its remit was far wider than its English counterpart, Ofsted. HMIe's equivalent in Wales, Estyn, had a similar remit, including adult education.

Following the Scotland Act 1998, the Inspectorate was made an Executive Agency of the Scottish Government in 2001, and HMIE was answerable to the Scottish Ministers for the running of the Inspectorate and the whole inspection system in Scotland.

In 2003 it employed 178 staff who were based in Edinburgh, Inverness, Glasgow and Dundee. A policy to disperse public sector jobs then led to the relocation of the headquarters from Edinburgh to Livingston in West Lothian, along with the opening of new offices in Dunbartonshire and Ayrshire.

On 14 October 2010, the Cabinet Secretary for Education announced that HMIe would be brigaded with Learning and Teaching Scotland into a new executive agency of the Scottish Government to be known as the Scottish Education Quality and Improvement Agency. This was later renamed Education Scotland, and came into existence on 30 June 2011.

On 25 June 2025, the Scottish Parliament passed the Education (Scotland) Act 2025, which separated responsibility for school inspections from Education Scotland, re-establishing HMIE as a statutory body independent of the Scottish Government.

Senior Chief Inspector 1999 to 2002: Douglas Osler
Senior Chief Inspector 2002 to 2009: Graham Donaldson
Senior Chief Inspector 2010 to 2017: Dr Bill Maxwell
Senior Chief Inspector from December 2017: Gayle Gorman

== Remit ==
HMIe is charged with inspecting the quality of education in pre-school centres, primary schools, secondary schools, special schools, community learning and development, further education colleges, initial teacher education, residential educational provision and the education functions of local authorities and services for children.

Following the passing of the Standards in Scotland’s Schools etc. 2000 Act, the focus of HMIE shifted to how this legislation is being implemented. It brought new statutory powers to inspect the education functions of local authorities.

== See also ==
- Education Scotland
- Education in the United Kingdom
- Education in Scotland
