= Education Scotland =

Executive agency

- Foghlam Alba

Executive Agency overview
- Formed: 1 July 2011
- Preceding agencies: HM Inspectorate of Education; Learning and Teaching Scotland
- Jurisdiction: Scotland
- Headquarters: Denholm House, Almondvale Business Park, Almondvale Way, Livingston, EH54 6GA
- Motto: Transforming lives through learning
- Employees: 281
- Annual budget: £28.7 million (2023—2024)
- Minister responsible: Màiri McAllan, Cabinet Secretary for Education, Culture and Gaelic
- Executive Agency executive: Gayle Gorman, Chief Executive and His Majesty’s Chief Inspector of Education
- Website: education.gov.scot

Education Scotland (Scottish Gaelic: Foghlam Alba) is an executive agency of the Scottish Government, tasked with improving the quality of the country's education system. Education Scotland was also responsible for inspecting Scotland's state–funded primary and secondary schools, as well as nursery schools which form part of a primary school, until this duty was transferred to His Majesty's Inspectorate of Education in 2025.

Independent, private schools in Scotland are regulated by the Scottish Council of Independent Schools in conjunction with Education Scotland. The Scottish Government minister responsible for Education Scotland and its functions is the Cabinet Secretary for Education, Culture and Gaelic. Established in 2011, it is based at Denholm House in Livingston, West Lothian.

== Origins ==
The creation of the Agency was announced by Scottish Government Education and Lifelong Learning Cabinet Minister Michael Russell on 14 October 2010.

It was intended to bring together the work and responsibilities of Her Majesty's Inspectorate of Education and Learning and Teaching Scotland and was originally entitled the Scottish Education Quality and Improvement Agency (SEQIA).

The name was later changed to Education Scotland and the agency was established under this name on 1 July 2011.

On establishment Education Scotland also incorporated the Scottish Government Positive Behaviour Team, which aims to support Scottish schools and local authorities to introduce and embed approaches that promote positive relationships and behaviour, and the National CPD Team, which aims to provide strategic support for continuing professional development (CPD) and professional review throughout Scottish education.

== Remit ==
Education Scotland's core purpose and strategic priorities are:

- to lead and support successful implementation of the curriculum
- to build the capacity of education providers and practitioners to improve their own performance
- to promote high quality professional learning and leadership
- to stimulate creativity and innovation
- to provide independent evaluation on the quality of educational provision
- to provide evidence-based advice to inform national policy
- to develop its people and improve its organisational capability

== Key areas of work ==
Evaluation of the quality of learning and teaching in Scottish schools and education services through Inspection and review of Scottish education

Provision of support and resources for learning and teaching via the Education Scotland online service.

=== Inspection of schools ===
Education Scotland is tasked with inspecting Scotland's primary, secondary and, sometimes in partnership with the Care Inspectorate, nursery schools. At times, both Education Scotland and the Care Inspectorate may carry out their own individual inspections of nursery schools and Early Learning and Childcare (ELCC) provision in Scotland. The purpose of Education Scotland's inspections are to improve learning, teaching and attainment along with the quality of learning and teaching in Scottish schools.

A new inspection model was introduced in August 2016.

=== Partnership with Care Inspectorate ===
Nursery schools in Scotland, commonly referred to as Early Years Centres, are inspected by both Education Scotland and the Care Inspectorate. Each body has typically used their own inspection framework, with a separate set of quality indicators used by inspectors undertaking inspections in nurseries. In August 2023, a joint statement from Education Scotland and the Care Inspectorate confirmed that both bodies were commencing work to begin a "shared inspection framework". Both bodies had previously confirmed that a nursery would not receive an inspection within 18 months or either body carrying out a previous inspection within the 18 month timeframe, unless "there are exceptional circumstances" which would indicate an inspection would be required to take place sooner. If Education Scotland announces an inspection of a primary school with a nursery class provision, the Head Teacher can request the nursery class not to be inspected if an inspection from the Care Inspectorate had occurred within the last 18 months.

The proposed joint working agreement between Education Scotland and the Care Inspectorate aim to " maintain high levels of efficiency and effectiveness and to streamline the paperwork requested from providers". Additional changes to the inspection structure proposes a joint questionnaire issued to parents, as well as joint self-evaluation and inspection report formats. Education Scotland inspections will have an inspector from the Care Inspectorate present during Education Scotland inspections of nurseries in Scotland.

== See also ==
- Ofsted
- Estyn
- Education Training Inspectorate (Northern Ireland)
