= St Margaret's School for Girls =

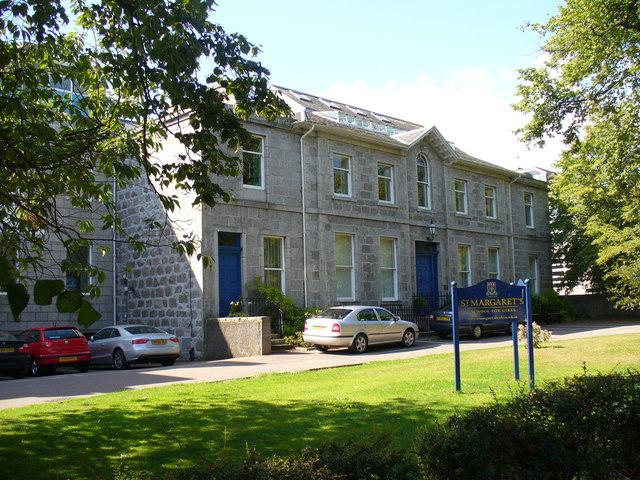

Location
- 17 Albyn Place; Aberdeen, AB10 1RU; Scotland; 57.1427°N 2.1153°W

Information
- Type: Private day school
- Motto: French: Tenez Ferme (Hold Fast)
- Established: 1846
- Local authority: Aberdeen City Council
- Head: Anna Tomlinson
- Gender: Girls
- Age: 3 to 18
- Enrolment: 330+
- Houses: Crathes, Dunnottar, Kildrummy
- Website: St Margaret's School for Girls

St Margaret’s School for Girls is the oldest all-through girls’ school in Scotland and caters for pupils aged three to 18 in a nursery, junior school and senior school.

St Margaret's is a member of the Scottish Council of Independent Schools (SCIS), Girls' Schools Association and Queen Margaret of Scotland Girls' Schools Association. Girls from all faiths and denominations can gain into the school.

== History ==
=== Beginnings, 1846-1888 ===
The school was first established in 1846 by 21-year-old Ann Stephen as a day school for girls in the drawing room of her parents' house at 1 Union Wynd, where pupils were taught writing, music, sewing, French and German. After 10 years, the school moved to 13 Union Row, where it was extended to a 'day and boarding school'. Miss Stephen retired in 1874, and the school was taken over by two sisters, the Misses Reid, who ran it for just four years.

In 1878, Mary Andrew became headteacher, teaching French to the girls and insisting that they speak it at all meals and for certain hours in the evening; a fine was imposed on anyone who lapsed. According to the 1881 census, 13 boarders from the age of 11 to 19 lived at the school with Miss Andrew and a governess, a cook and a servant. Sadly, Miss Andrew died at the age of 40 in 1888.

=== St Margaret's 1888-1929 ===
Sisters, Isabella and Jean Duncan, took over in 1888, moving the school to 31 Union Grove as it grew. Pupils were expected to dress with 'a sense of propriety', and an early photograph shows the girls wearing ankle-length skirts and long-sleeved white blouses. Spot checks on deportment and behaviour were made at the end of the school day to check that the girls were behaving in a seemly manner.

In May 1890, the school made its last move to 17 Albyn Place, where it remains today. A kindergarten class was established and the school was officially named St Margaret's School for Girls.

The ‘best’ rooms were the sitting room, with its veranda and stairs leading down to the back garden (the present headteacher’s room), and the drawing room (present library), with its bow-window, polished floor and gilt chairs.

Following the sisters’ retirement, the newly formed Council appointed Mary C. Bell as the first headteacher of the new independent St Margaret's. Electric lighting and a system of central heating were installed throughout, the big drawing-room was converted into a gymnasium and the assembly hall was turned into a library. The rooms where boarders had slept became classrooms and a staff room was established.

Miss Bell introduced the prefect system, and founded the dramatic club and the debating society. She also started sports day and gymnastic and dancing displays. Two hockey pitches were rented, and tennis courts were borrowed from the Grammar School boarding house until 1926, when ground for two hockey pitches and two netball courts was acquired at King's Gate. Through gifts from Council, three tennis courts were laid out, and a sports pavilion was built. Miss Bell taught the girls of St Margaret's to think for themselves, to acquire a sense of responsibility and to have pride in their school.

=== The School Well Established, 1929-1952 ===
Miss Bell's successor was Mabel E. Holland and, under her able direction, the school rode out the problems of disruption and evacuation caused by the Second World War. Inheriting a school roll of 134, Miss Holland left with 365 pupils on the books. While maintaining the traditions and standards of the past, Miss Holland introduced new schemes, including a school magazine, The Chronicle, the building of a school hall, and the purchase of 15 Albyn Place. Meanwhile, the number of girls leaving school with the necessary qualification to attend university was growing steadily. The school hall was built and within a few months of the hall's opening, a passageway - known to this day as 'the pink passage' - was added to connect the new hall with the old school building. By March 1934, enough money had been raised to add extra rooms behind the hall, which doubled as green rooms for dramatic performances and as music practice rooms. The new building also allowed for the introduction of a Nursery Class. This was the first 'West-end' Nursery School in Aberdeen. Miss Holland also introduced the school uniform.

However, the Second World War brought Miss Holland and her staff their greatest challenges. On her arrival at school in August 1939, with the new session due to start, Miss Holland was greeted by the news that 17 Albyn Place had been requisitioned for the Food Office.

=== The Boarding Houses, 1856-1989 ===
For 133 years, pupils boarded at the school. As the numbers of boarders grew, the school acquired 7, and later No 6 Queen's Gardens. At the junior boarding house, Canmore House, the children were allowed to keep pets and each boarder had a small piece of garden.

With the coming of war in 1939, the boarding houses were evacuated to the country, for the greater safety of the children and because the school’s buildings were requisitioned. Glenbuchat, 40 miles from Aberdeen on Upper Donside, was the first place of refuge. Here was remoteness indeed, especially for those in Glenbuchat Lodge, where the main road was seven miles away; a horse-drawn sleigh was needed to deliver the groceries in the snowy winter of 1939.

In autumn 1947, (following the sale of the Queen's Gardens properties) the School Council purchased Culter House, which became home to many boarders for 41 years. However, as the number of boarders declined, the decision was taken to discontinue boarding and sell Culter House. After 133 years of boarding, St Margaret's was once more a day school.

=== The post-war years onwards ===
A long line of Heads have followed, along with many new improvements: a 'new look' uniform, a new telephone exchange, new lighting and nursery equipment were purchased, a new physics laboratory, a music room, and an improved gym. By 1983, a new six classroom junior block had been added, and in 1989, the Parents' Association was founded, along with the Pupil Council. An impressive new computing room was created and in 1996, St Margaret's built a music suite, a general purpose hall (the GP room), and two new classrooms. A new pavilion at the Summerhill playing fields was opened in 2009.

In 2015, the school completed its largest estate development in almost 20 years with the opening of its new state-of-the-art science block, which was officially opened by renowned British astrophysicist Dame Jocelyn Bell Burnell, who is credited with one of the most significant astronomical discoveries of the 20th century, that of radio pulsars. The new facility comprises five laboratories, a technician’s room and a project room. Shortly after, new art and drama studios were also unveiled.

== Academics ==
In 2018, St Margaret’s celebrated another year of excellent results. The pass rate at Advanced Higher was 96% (A-C grade), with 90% of grades awarded at A or B grade, while the pass rate was 95% at Higher level for S5 pupils (A-C grade), with 88% achieving A or B grade. Pupils in fourth year received a 98% pass rate at National 5, with 90% of candidates achieving at A or B level.
