= Douglas Cairns =

British classicist (born 1961)

Douglas Cairns FHEA FRSE FBA MAE
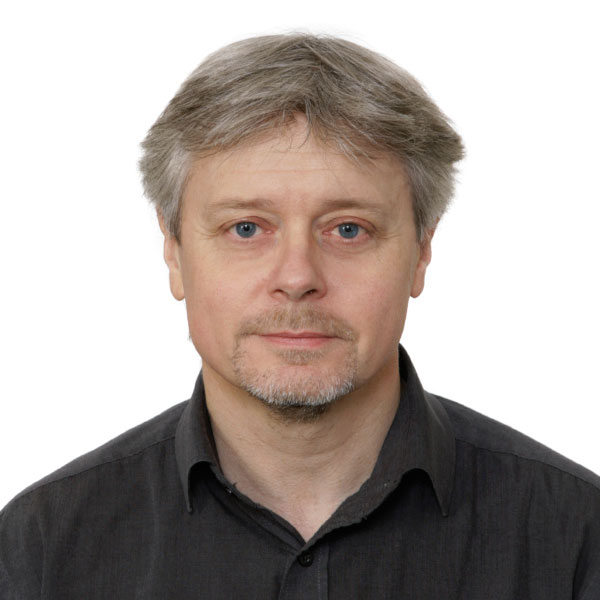
- Born: 10 January 1961 (age 65); Glasgow, Scotland

Academic background
- Education: University of Glasgow (MA, PhD)
- Doctoral advisor: Douglas MacDowell; Alexander F. Garvie

Academic work
- Discipline: Classics
- Sub-discipline: Emotions, Distributed Cognition, aidos
- Institutions: University of St Andrews; Georg-August Universität; University of Otago; University of Leeds; University of Glasgow; University of Edinburgh
- Notable works: Aidôs: The Psychology and Ethics of Honour and Shame in Ancient Greek Literature (1993)

Douglas Laidlaw Cairns (born 10 January 1961) is a Scottish classicist. Since 2004, he has served as Professor of Classics at the University of Edinburgh. He specialises in the study of Greek society, ethics, literature, emotional life, and the ways in which these are reflected in Greek epic, tragedy, and lyric poetry.

== Early life ==
Cairns was born in Glasgow on 10 January 1961, growing up on the Sandyhills estate. His father was the local agent for the Co-operative Insurance Society and a prominent member of the local branch of the Communist Party of Great Britain, while his mother worked for the mobile unit of the Blood Transfusion Service.

Cairns was taught Greek and Latin at Eastbank Academy in Glasgow's East End, one of the last state-maintained schools in Scotland to teach Latin.

== Career ==
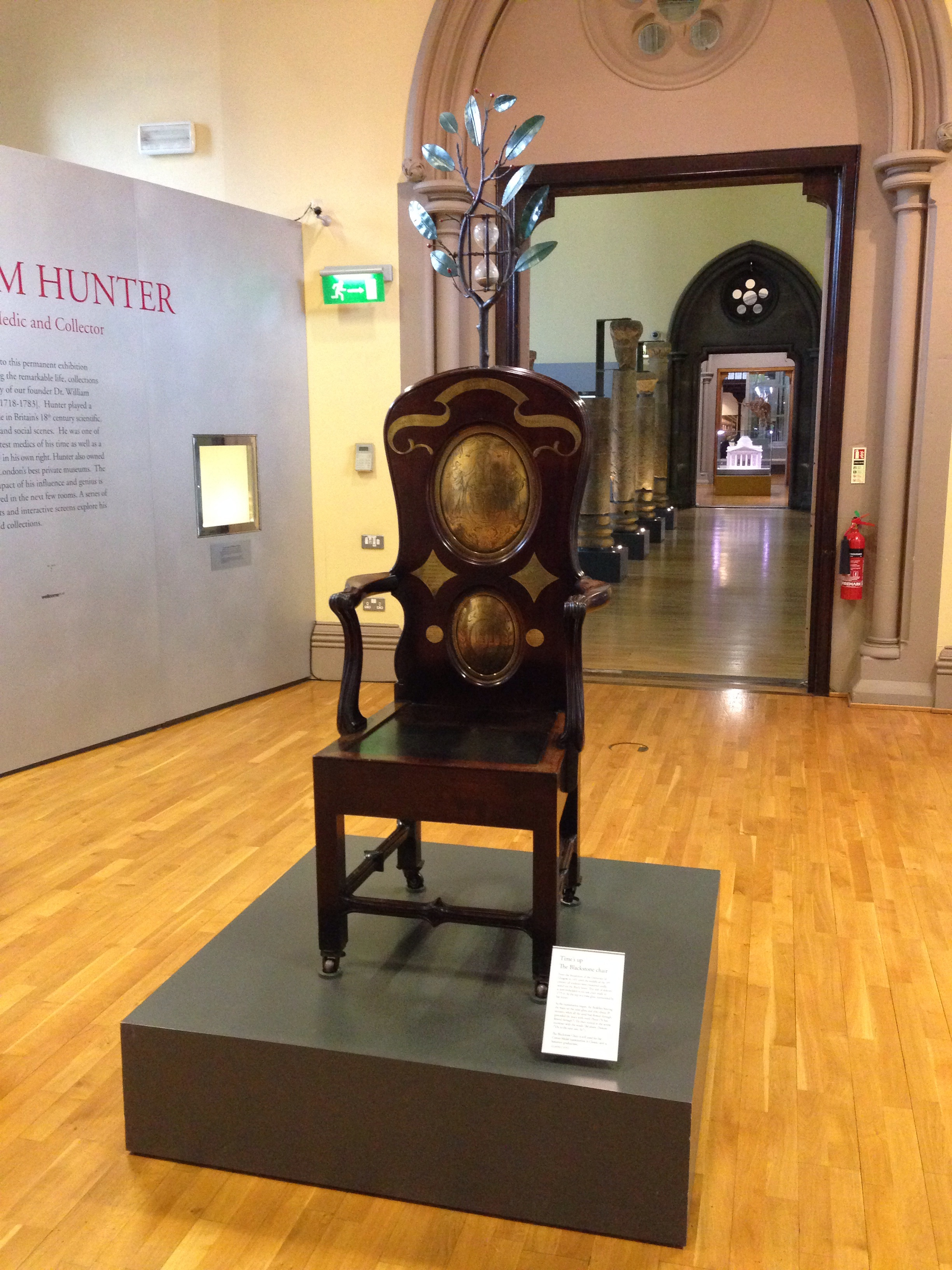
The Blackstone Chair. Cairns was a Cowan medalist in 1981.

Cairns graduated with a MA (Hons) in Classics from the University of Glasgow in 1983, where he was a Cowan Blackstone Medallist in 1981, and was awarded a PhD in Greek from Glasgow in December 1987 for a thesis on the Greek concept of aidōs, or "shame". His thesis was supervised by Douglas MacDowell (then Professor of Greek), and Aeschylus scholar Alexander Garvie.

Cairns' work incorporated psychological, anthropological and behavioural research into the study of Greek philology. Significantly, Cairns' work challenged the prominent anthropological dichotomy between 'shame cultures' and 'guilt cultures' which had become central to the scholarship of Hellenists like E. R. Dodds and A. W. H. Adkins, and he went far in arguing that Ancient Greece was not, as had often been claimed, a 'shame culture'. In recent years, Cairns has become a field-leading researcher in the use of conceptual metaphor theory as applied to classical texts, and his work has been described as "one of the first moments of serious engagement with conceptual metaphor in Homeric studies".

Cairns held academic positions at the University of St Andrews, Georg-August Universität, University of Otago, University of Leeds, and the University of Glasgow before he took up the Chair of Classics at Edinburgh in 2004, serving as the Head of Classics from 2004 to 2005, and then as Head of the School of History, Classics and Archaeology from 2005 to 2008. He served as Chair of Council of the Classical Association from 2019 to 2024, and is Chair of the Board of Trustees at Edinburgh University Press.

== Research fellowships ==
Cairns has held research fellowships at Georg-August Universität, Humboldt Universität, Technische Universität Dresden, won a major research fellowship from the Leverhulme Trust, and a senior research fellowship from the ERC/Oxford University Project "The Social and Cultural Construction of Emotions". He directed the AHRC-funded project "A History of Distributed Cognition" and the Leverhulme Trust International Research Network's "Emotions through Time". He is currently director of the ERC AdG Project 'Honour in Classical Greece'.

He was Visiting Professor in Classics at Kyoto University, Japan (2008), the Peter A. Vlachos Lecturer in Classics at Colby College (2007), Margaret Heavey Lecturer in Classics at NUI Galway (2009), Platsis Symposiast at the University of Michigan (2009), George R. Langford Family Eminent Scholar Chair, Florida State University (2012), and the Visiting Professor in Classics at the University of Pisa (2017). He has also taught at the University of Bologna (2013, 2017), International Christian University, Tokyo (2017), Tokyo University (2017), Fu Jen University, Taiwan (2018), the Scuola Normale di Pisa (2021), and the Università di Cagliari (2022).

He is a Fellow of the British Academy, the Royal Society of Edinburgh a Member of the Academia Europaea, and a recipient of the Anneliese Maier Research Prize awarded by the Alexander von Humboldt Foundation.

== David Hume Tower ==
Cairns was a signatory to a series of letters addressed to Principal of Edinburgh University, Peter Mathesion, by various members of university staff (including Sir Tom Devine) who were opposed to the renaming of David Hume Tower. The renaming followed a small student campaign. Cairns, writing for the Scottish Review, has argued that "Symbolic gestures such as the renaming of buildings in themselves do absolutely nothing to address the real problems of racism, xenophobia, and inequality that beset our society, and there is a real danger that they may in fact serve as cover for the absence of any genuine attempt to do so."

== Selected works ==
=== Books ===
- Sophocles: Antigone (London: Bloomsbury, 2016)
- Bacchylides: Five Epinician Odes (3, 5, 9, 11 and 13) (Cambridge: Francis Cairns Publications Ltd, 2010)
- Aidôs: The Psychology and Ethics of Honour and Shame in Ancient Greek Literature (Oxford: Oxford University Press, 1993)

=== Edited volumes ===
- A Cultural History of the Emotions in Antiquity (London: Bloomsbury, 2019)
- (with M J Anderson and M Sprevak), Distributed Cognition in Classical Antiquity (Edinburgh: Edinburgh University Press, 2018)
- (with D P Nelis), Emotions in the Classical World: Methods, Approaches, and Directions (Stuttgart: Steiner, 2017)
- Tragedy and Archaic Greek Thought (Swansea: Classical Press of Wales, 2013)
- (with V Liapis), Dionysalexandros: Essays on Aeschylus and his Fellow Tragedians in Honour of Alexander F Garvie (Swansea: Classical Press of Wales, 2006)
- (with R A Knox), Law, Rhetoric, and Comedy in Classical Athens: Essays in Honour of Douglas M MacDowell (Swansea: Classical Press of Wales, 2004)
- Oxford Readings in Homer's Iliad (Oxford: Oxford University Press, 2001)
