= Dictionary of Greek and Roman Biography and Mythology =

Encyclopedia and biographical dictionary ed. by William Smith (1849)

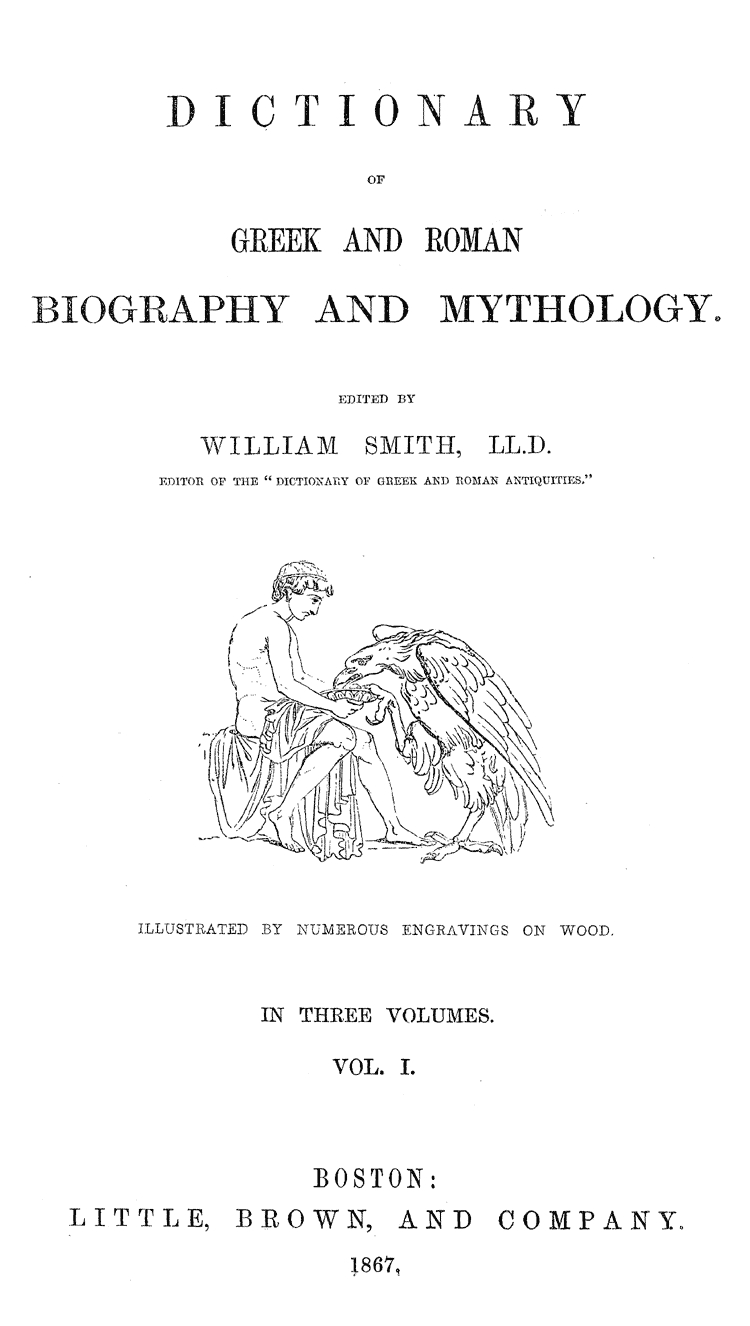
- Title page of 1867 edition
- Author: William Smith
- Publication date: 1844–1849
- Pages: 3,700
- Text: Dictionary of Greek and Roman Biography and Mythology at Wikisource

The Dictionary of Greek and Roman Biography and Mythology is a biographical dictionary of classical antiquity, edited by William Smith and originally published in London by Taylor, Walton (and Maberly) and John Murray from 1844 to 1849 in three volumes of more than 3,700 pages. It is a classic work of 19th-century lexicography. The work is a companion to Smith's Dictionary of Greek and Roman Antiquities and Dictionary of Greek and Roman Geography.

== Authors and scope ==
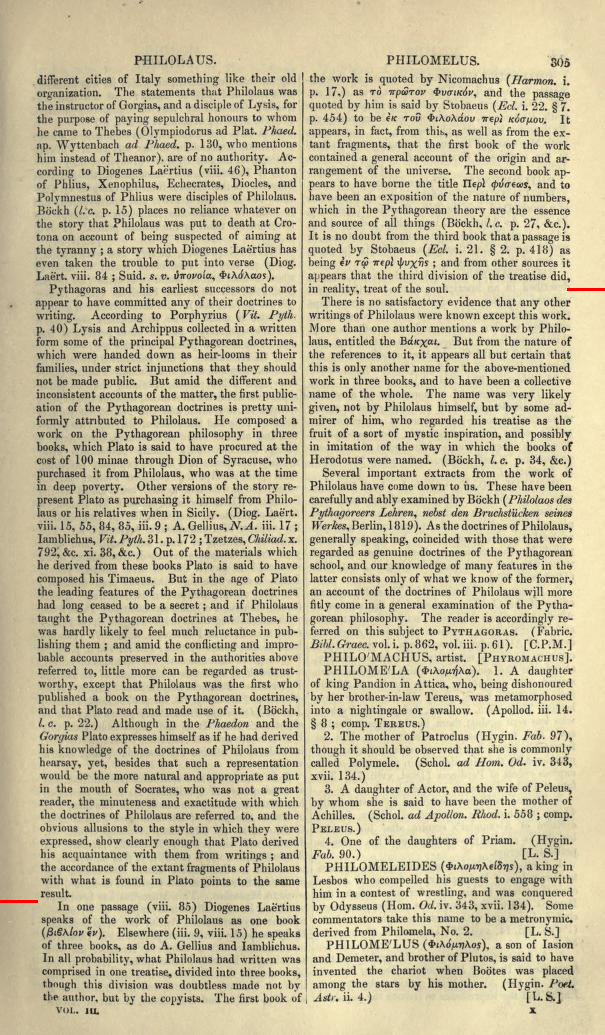
Excerpt from Philolaus Pythagoras book (Charles Peter Mason, 1870)

The work lists thirty-five authors in addition to the editor, who was also the author of the unsigned articles. The other authors were classical scholars, primarily from Oxford, Cambridge, Rugby School, and the University of Bonn, but some were from other institutions. Many of the mythological entries were the work of the German expatriate Leonhard Schmitz, who helped to popularise German classical scholarship in Britain.

With respect to biographies, Smith intended to be comprehensive. In the preface, he writes:

The biographical articles in this work include the names of all persons of any importance which occur in the Greek and Roman writers, from the earliest times down to the extinction of the Western Empire in the year 476 of our era, and to the extinction of the Eastern Empire by the capture of Constantinople by the Turks in the year 1453.

Much of the value of the Dictionary consists not only in the depth and detail of the individual articles, but in the copious and specific citations to individual Greek and Roman writers, as well as modern scholarship from the Renaissance to the mid-nineteenth century. The articles frequently note variant traditions, disagreements among the authorities, and the interpretations of modern scholars. However, due to the variable numbering systems used in different editions of classical works, and the difficulty of recognizing typographical errors in citations, the original sources should still be checked. Many of the Dictionary's articles have been referred to in more recent works; Robert Graves has been accused of cribbing his impressive-looking source references from it when writing The Greek Myths.

Samuel Sharpe thought Edward Bunbury had plagiarised his work, as he wrote of in his diary entry on 3 September 1850:

I certainly felt mortified on reading the articles on the Ptolemies in Dr. Smith's "Dictionary of Classical Biography." They were all written by E. H. Bunbury with the help of my "History of Egypt," and with-out any acknowledgment, though he even borrowed the volume from my brother Dan for the purpose.

=== Notable authors ===
- John Ernest Bode, Anglican hymnist.
- Christian August Brandis, German philologist.
- Albany James Christie, ecclesiastical historian.
- Arthur Hugh Clough, poet and assistant to Florence Nightingale
- George Cotton, educationalist and Bishop of Calcutta
- Samuel Davidson, biblical scholar
- William Fishburn Donkin, Savilian Professor of Astronomy at the University of Oxford.
- William Bodham Donne, theatrical censor and Examiner of Plays, the UK's chief theatrical censor.
- Thomas Henry Dyer, historian.
- Edward Elder, headmaster of Charterhouse and Durham School.
- John T. Graves, Irish mathematician who wrote the Dictionary's biographies of the jurists Cato, Crassus, Drusus, Gaius, as well as an article on the legislation of Justinian.
- William Alexander Greenhill, physician and medical writer.
- Wilhelm Ihne, German historian.
- Benjamin Jowett, Classicist, theologian and later master of Balliol College, Oxford.
- Henry Liddell, headmaster of Westminster School and co-author of A Greek–English Lexicon.
- George Long, classicist.
- Henry Hart Milman, Anglican priest, Dean of St Paul's Cathedral and Professor of Poetry in the University of Oxford.
- Augustus De Morgan, mathematician and logician.
- William Ramsay, classical scholar and Professor of Humanity in the University of Glasgow.
- Leonhard Schmitz, expatriate Prussian classicist and rector of the Royal High School, Edinburgh.
- Arthur Penrhyn Stanley, theologian and later Dean of Westminster.
- Adolf Stahr, German writer and literary historian.
- Ludwig von Urlichs, German philologist and archaeologist.

== Use and availability today ==
The work is now in the public domain, and is available in several places on the Internet. A 2013 review of the fourth edition of the Oxford Classical Dictionary – itself hailed in its first edition in 1949 as "the new Smith" – called it:

Still surprisingly useful over factual matters that depend more or less exclusively on ancient literary sources, where its entries tend to be both thorough and accurate.

Smith's dictionary, however, does have substantial flaws. Troy and Knossos, for example, "the editors still regarded... as minstrels' fantasies". Much is missing, especially more recent discoveries (such as Aristotle's Constitution of the Athenians or the decipherment of Linear B) and epigraphic material. More seriously, the context in which ancient evidence is viewed, analysed, reconciled, and understood has changed considerably in the intervening centuries. Modern theories and reconstructions of events are also not present, if only because they were published decades and centuries after Smith's Dictionary.

== See also ==
- Dictionary of Greek and Roman Antiquities
- Dictionary of Greek and Roman Geography
