= Josiah Walker =

Josiah Walker (1761–1831) was a Scottish writer, from 1815 Professor of Humanity at Glasgow University. He is known as a biographer of Robert Burns.

== Life ==
Walker was the son of Thomas Walker, minister at Dundonald, and his third wife Annie Shaw. He was educated at Edinburgh High School and Edinburgh University. At university he formed a group with James Finlayson and George Husband Baird, for extra-curricular linguistic researches. He took notes on Dugald Stewart's course of 1778–9.

After graduating, Walker spent seven years in Edinburgh as a tutor. He joined the Speculative Society in 1783. In 1787, he took the position as tutor to the Marquess of Tullibardine, eldest son of John Murray, 4th Duke of Atholl, and accompanied him to Eton College.

From 1796, Walker was a customs officer in Perth. When the Perth Courier, a Tory newspaper, was set up in 1808, Walker became its editor. He was also involved in the compilation of the Encyclopaedia Perthensis. In 1809 he was vice-president of the Literary and Antiquarian Society of Perth.

Walker's biography of Burns. "Miscellaneous Remarks on the Writings of Burns", was published in an 1811 edition of the poems, Poems by Robert Burns with an Account of his Life. It was then printed separately. Walker had first met Burns at the Edinburgh house of Thomas Blacklock. They had another encounter at Blair Atholl, and Walker had known Burns in Dumfriesshire, without being a close friend. He drew on and acknowledged the earlier Burns edition by James Currie. The book was put out by the trustees of James Morison (1762–1809) of Perth.

In 1815 Walker became Professor of Humanity at Glasgow University. Among his students was the poet Robert Pollok. George Milligan (died 1856), later minister of Elie, acted as his assistant.

== Works ==
Walker wrote The Defence of Order – A Poem (1802), which defended the policy of William Pitt the Younger and was dedicated to the Duke of Atholl. It sold well, and was attacked by Henry Brougham in the Edinburgh Review.

He also contributed articles to the Encyclopaedia Britannica and Edinburgh Encyclopaedia. Walker has been tentatively identified as involved in Edinburgh Review articles of 1806 and 1811, reviews of religious books.

== Family ==
Walker married in 1795 Margaret Bell, daughter of Richard Bell of Cruvie in Dumfriesshire; they had three sons and a daughter. The eldest son was Thomas Walker M.D. (1796–1886), who practised in Peterborough. The second son Richard Graham Walker practised as a solicitor in Glasgow and Hendon. The youngest son, Josiah (1805–1882), was a graduate of Trinity Hall, Cambridge and cleric. The daughter, Russel (died 1886 at age 89 ), married in 1827 Thomas Grierson, a cousin and minister of Kirkbean.
