= William Moodie =

Scottish minister

William Moodie or Mudie FRSE (1759–1812) was a Scottish Minister who served as Moderator of the General Assembly of the Church of Scotland in 1799. He was also a philologist, and Professor of Hebrew (and Oriental Languages) at Edinburgh University.

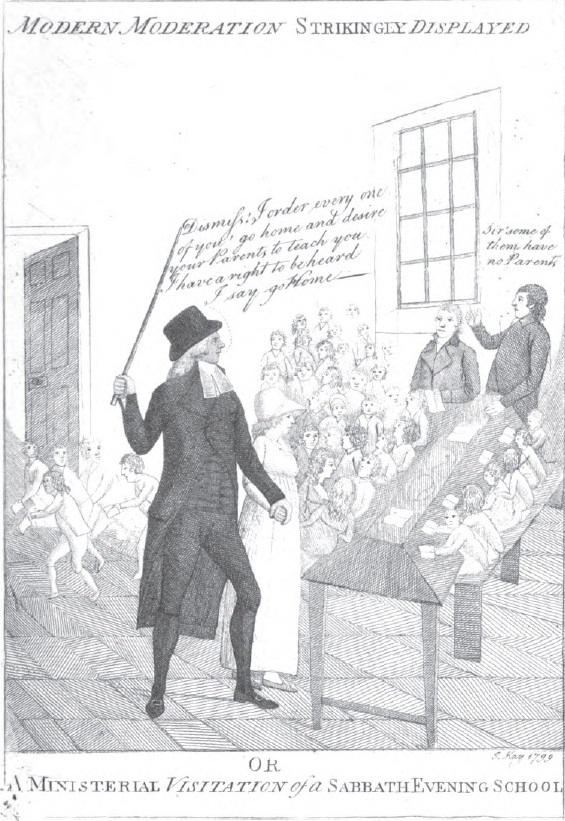

== Early life ==
He was born on 2 July 1759, the son of Roger Moodie, Minister of Gartly, Strathbogie and his wife, Margaret Scott. His father moved to the post of Minister of Monimail, near Cupar, in 1766, where William attended the parish school. In 1773, William enrolled at the University of St Andrews. His father died when he was sixteen, in 1775, and he moved to Edinburgh, where "he finished his course of Theological study with distinguished approbation"

== Contested appointment ==
He was licensed by the Presbytery to preach the gospel in 1781 and became tutor to the family of James Oswald of Dunnikier. William apparently impressed with his preaching and Mr Oswald, the parish's Patron, along with several other parishioners presented him to the parish of Kirkcaldy. This was "violently opposed" by others, but he was ordained Minister of Kirkcaldy on 9 June 1784. His biographer says he won over the doubters by showing no resentments himself and being an exemplary Minister.

"Carefully avoiding those intricate discussions, which tend rather to perplex than to enlighten the mind, he was guided in his selection of subjects for discourse, by their general importance and utility ...The striking light in which he exhibited the truth of the gospels; the clearness with which he explained its doctrines and its precepts; the tenderness with which he applied its consolations to soothe the afflicted; the solemnity with which he warned the impenitent of the consequences of their guilt, and the earnestness with which he exhorted the righteous to persevere in the paths of holiness, roused the attention and interested the hearts of all whom he addressed."

However, he did feel obliged to refer to his opponents, at some length, in his final sermon before he left for Edinburgh three years later, telling them he bore them no ill-will, and leaving them to their consciences.

== Professor of Hebrew ==
In 1787, he was asked by the Town Council of Edinburgh to be Minister of St Andrew's Church in the fashionable New Town and he took up post on 25 October 1787. Six years later (1793) they added the post of Professor of Hebrew and Oriental Languages at the university, which he held in conjunction with his position at St Andrew's Church until he died. During this time he initially lived on North Hanover Street and then at 12 Frederick Street, both at that time, new Georgian townhouses in the First New Town of Edinburgh.

In 1788 he was elected a Fellow of the Royal Society of Edinburgh. His proposers were John Playfair, James Hutton and Rev James Finlayson.

He taught Hebrew and Chaldaic to students as required by the university, and "by divesting it (Hebrew) of every useless encumbrence, he exhibited it to their view in all its native simplicity and beauty". He also added Persian to the curriculum. It is not one of the Christian sacred languages, but he seems to have a particular fondness for Persian and its culture – the science, philosophy and (particularly) poetry. He had acquired proficiency in this language by private study and, by daily conversation with a "learned native of India" then in residence in Edinburgh, acquired a perfect pronunciation. Persian was the diplomatic language of the Indian Empire, where many Edinburgh students hoped to make a career, so his classes were a success. He liked to compare the Hebrew and Persian grammars with what he called Universal Grammar so as to highlight the differences, so that his students developed judgement and not just a memory for words. He edited the third edition of a standard Hebrew Grammar and he corresponded worldwide with other renowned Persian scholars (a number of whom suggested, in 1800, that they set up an Oriental Society). The university made him Doctor of Divinity in 1798.

== Ministry ==
He thought of his Edinburgh congregation as a diverse one. He certainly was in attendance in 1788 at the hanging for theft and shopbreaking of one Peter Young. Others had a more jaundiced view. A reviewer of his published sermons thought

His audience was almost entirely composed of the higher classes of society. He was attended chiefly by the fashionable and the gay, the wealthy and the learned; and he succeeded in obtaining, what appears to have been the object of his ambition, their applause and admiration of his discourses.

The same reviewer, while noting the elegance of the discourses, was scandalised at the lack of what he thought of as proper Christian content in the sermons – such as, the consciousness of human depravity, the need for conversion, repentance and faith in Jesus Christ, to avoid an otherwise certain eternal punishment. It may well have been Moodie's distaste for these topics that had prompted such opposition in Kirkaldy. Parishioners who felt their rights as Presbyterians were being over-ridden resented having so-called Moderate Ministers imposed on them – appointed by Patrons or presented by the local landowners. They wished to interrogate the firmness of the proposed Minister's adherence to standards of belief such as the Westminster Confession of Faith, rather than his broader accomplishments, or connections. There were social class elements to this division, which were highly sensitive around the time of the French Revolution. The Evangelicals, as the opponents of the Moderates, were called, were by no means confined to the lower orders, but they were well represented among them and those in power feared the issue might be used as a front for more political unrest. Moodie was very much a Moderate and supported measures "he thought conducive to the respectability of our ecclesiastical establishment, to the maintenance of public order, and to the advancement of true religion".

== Moderator of the General Assembly ==
In 1799, Moodie was elected Moderator of the General Assembly of the Church of Scotland. It was in the middle of the French Revolutionary Wars and Britain was haunted by the threat of foreign invasion coupled with insurrection at home, particularly in Ireland and in the industrial areas. Moodie presided over a fairly anxious meeting. After congratulating the King on recent naval victories on the Nile and off the Irish coast, the General Assembly expressed gratitude for living in such a free country under so beneficent a king. It deprecated the savage actions of the French Revolutionaries and their attacks on established order and even Christianity itself. The King, in a letter, had asked them to do all in their power to keep their parishioners loyal and virtuous, which they in turn promised to do. They also adopted a Declaratory Act, against "unlicensed" or "vagrant" teachers of the gospel, especially those teaching outdoors or in unregulated Sabbath schools, where loose talk about democracy and Thomas Paine could lead to trouble. A Public Admonition was drawn up, to be read out in every Parish, reminding their parishioners of the happy country in which they are blest to dwell, warning them about the evils of the French Revolutionaries, or of listening to the unlicensed teachers or attending unregulated Sunday schools. A committee reported on a detailed examination of the law, which, it claimed, gave the Parish Minister the right to inspect all educational premises in his parish, including the universities and private or voluntary establishments.

At this time he had moved house within the New Town to 7 George Street.

In 1803 he was appointed Honorary Chaplain (Pontifex Maximus) of the Harveian Society of Edinburgh. In 1812 he was awarded the honorific 'Diploma of Doctor of Merriment' by members of the Society.

== Modern Moderation? ==
John Kay's caricature "Modern Moderation" shows how seriously Moodie took this responsibility. When some Sabbath School teachers asked him to visit them to reassure them and him that they were law-abiding, orthodox Christians, he turned up, and without giving a moment's attention to them, told the pupils to leave immediately and their parent's would answer any questions. Later, in 1805, he was part of a group of Edinburgh clergy who opposed the appointment of John Leslie as Professor of Mathematics at the university, for holding views "destructive of all religion". In his "Essay on Heat" he had seemed to approve of some aspect of the work of sceptical philosopher David Hume. They pursued him through the Presbytery and the Synod up to the General Assembly. There was a tumultuous debate, for which the public queued for hours to get in, after which the Assembly dismissed the complaint against Professor Leslie. There is a letter from Robert Burns to Moodie, defending his friend James Clarke, schoolmaster at Moffat against a charge of cruelty to his pupils.

== Personal life ==
He married Johanna Lindsay on 10 November 1786, who died 24 August 1796, and had a daughter Margaret, born 29 December 1789; son John, born December 1790, died 10 February 1791; George Mackenzie, born 7 February 1795, died 13 March 1800; Sarah, born 11 August 1796 (who married Dugald Campbell, Minister of Glassary in Argyleshire, who wrote the Statistical Account of Scotland Report for the parish). In 1800 he was living at 7 George Street in the city centre.

Moodie thus had a fairly tragic personal life. He was also afflicted with a "weak stomach" and was subject to such violent attack in 1803 that it seemed he would not recover and he had to abandon the pulpit. By now he had an assistant Minister, David Ritchie, professor of Logic at the university. In 1810, he had another attack and had to abandon preaching again. He began to prepare his sermons for publications (for the benefit of posterity).

Moodie lived his final years at 17 George Street in Edinburgh's First New Town.

After a stay in the countryside, he seemed to recover during the winter of 1811/12, but his illness returned in force in May 1812 and he died on 11 June 1812. His congregation arranged for the publication of his sermons, to which was attached an account of his life by someone who seemed very close and familiar with him.

== Publications ==
- Political Preaching, or the Meditations of a Well-meaning Man, in a letter addressed to the Rev. William Dun, min. of Kirkintilloch (Glasgow, 1792)
- Four single Sermons (Edinburgh, 1794–1799)
- The instructions to be derived from recalling the memory of our fathers, a sermon, preached before the Society Incorporated by Royal Charter for the Benefit of the Sons of the Clergy of the Established Church of Scotland, in the Tron Church of Edinburgh, 19 May. 1797 (Edinburgh, 1797)
- Observations on the Overture respecting Chapels-of-Ease (Edinburgh, 1797)
- A Cobbler's Remarks on a Tour through the Northern Counties (Edinburgh, 1798)
- United and vigorous exertion, in defence of our country, recommended; a sermon (Edinburgh, 1798)
- An address to the public, on the much lamented death of Sir Ralph Abercromby, late commander in chief of His Majesty's forces in Egypt : being part of a sermon, preached in St. Andrew's Church, on Sunday, 7 June 1801 (Edinburgh, 1801)
- Sermon II. (Scotch Preacher, iv; Edinburgh, 1789)
- Sermons, with a Short Account of his Life (Edinburgh, 1813)
- Wilson's Hebrew Grammar, 3rd edition. (finalised and saw through press)

== Sources ==
- Acts of the General Assembly of the Church of Scotland 1638–1842 (Church Law Society, Edinburgh 1843), .
- Monthly Magazine and British Register Vol IX Pt 1 London 1800
- The Scots Magazine and Edinburgh Literary Miscellany, Volume LXVII 1805
- Moodie, William Sermons, to which is prefixed a short account of the author Edinburgh, 1813
- The Edinburgh Magazine, or Literary Miscellany Vol VIII 1788
- Kay, John A series of original portraits and caricature etchings Vol 1 Part II H. Paton, Carver & Gilder, Edinburgh 1838
- Bower, Alexander The History of the University of Edinburgh, Volume 3 Oliphant, Waugh and Innes, Edinburgh, 1830
- Paterson, William The Works of Robert Burns Vol 5 Edinburgh 1879
- Scott, Hew Fasti ecclesiae scoticanae – the succession of Ministers in the Church of Scotland from the Reformation Volume I Synod of Lothian and Tweedale Edinburgh 1920 pp 88/89
- Emerson, Roger L Academic patronage in the Scottish enlightenment: Glasgow, Edinburgh and St Andrews Universities Edinburgh University Press 2007
- Pratt, Josiah & Macaulay, Zachary (eds) The Christian Observer, Volume 13, Boston 1814
- Grierson, James Delineations of St. Andrews: being a particular account of every thing ...Cupar, 1833

== See also ==
- List of moderators of the General Assembly of the Church of Scotland

Church of Scotland titles
Preceded by William Taylor	Moderator of the General Assembly of the Church of Scotland; 1799	Succeeded by George Baird
