= Professor of Humanity =

Professor of Humanity may refer to:

- Professor of Humanity (Glasgow), a professorship in Latin at the University of Glasgow
- Professor of Humanity, a former professorship in Latin at the University of Edinburgh, now replaced by the Professor of Classics (Edinburgh)
- Regius Professor of Humanity, a professorship at the University of Aberdeen
