= James Moor (classicist) =

Scottish classicist (1712-1779)

James Moor (22 June 1712 – 17 September 1779) was a Scottish classical scholar, who served as Professor of Greek at the University of Glasgow from 1746 to 1774.

== Life and career ==
Moor was the son of Robert Moor, a schoolmaster in Glasgow, where he was born on 22 June 1712. In 1825 he entered the University of Glasgow, and distinguished himself especially in classics and mathematics. After graduating M.A., he was engaged for some time as teacher in a school in his native city, and subsequently travelled abroad as tutor to the Earls of Selkirk and Erroll. He was afterwards tutor to William Boyd, 4th Earl of Kilmarnock, until 1742, when he became librarian of the University of Glasgow. In 1746 he was elected to the chair of Greek there, promotion which he owed to the assistance of Dunbar Douglas, 4th Earl of Selkirk. In 1745 Moor made a journey to London in an endeavour to obtain a pardon for his patron the Earl of Kilmarnock, who had been condemned for his share in the Jacobite rebellion. His efforts were unsuccessful.

At the request of the university, Moor, in conjunction with George Muirhead, the Professor of Humanity, superintended the production of a magnificent edition of Homer in four folio volumes, published by the Foulises of Glasgow. To ensure the utmost accuracy of the text, every sheet was read six times before it was sent to press, twice by the ordinary corrector, once by Andrew Foulis, once by each of the editors separately, and finally by both conjunctly. Copies of this edition (1747) were already very rare by the late nineteenth century. For the Foulis press Moor also edited Herodotus and other classics. In 1761 he was appointed vice-rector of the university, and he received in 1763 the degree of Doctor of Laws.

Owing to bad health Moor resigned his chair in 1774, and died in Glasgow on 17 September 1779. During the period of his retirement Moor amused himself by writing Hudibrastic verses and epigrams, of which a number appeared in Notes and Queries during the nineteenth century. His valuable library and cabinet of medals were purchased by the university authorities.

== Selected publications ==
Besides editing Homer, Herodotus, Tyrtaeus, and other classical authors for the Foulises, Moor wrote several learned treatises, including:

- Essays read to a Literary Society at their Weekly Meetings. Glasgow, 1759.
- On the End of Tragedy, according to Aristotle. Glasgow, 1763.
- Addison's Cato, done into Latin Verse, without the Love Scenes. Glasgow, 1764.
- On the Prepositions of the Greek Language. Glasgow, 1766 (reprinted at Richmond, 1830).
- A Vindication of Virgil from the Charge of Puerility imputed to him by Dr. Pearce. Glasgow, 1766.
- Elementa Linguae Graecae Pars Prima. Glasgow, 1766. A favourite school-book in Scotland, it passed through many editions in Latin, and an English version by J. C. Rowlatt appeared in 1836.
