= George Gilbert Ramsay =

Scottish Professor of humanities, University of Glasgow & Alpinist (1839–1921)

Carbon print portrait by Thomas Annan in 1871

George Gilbert Ramsay (1839–1921) was the Professor of Humanity at the University of Glasgow and the first president of the Scottish Mountaineering Club.
