= Elizabeth Carmichael =

English portraitist

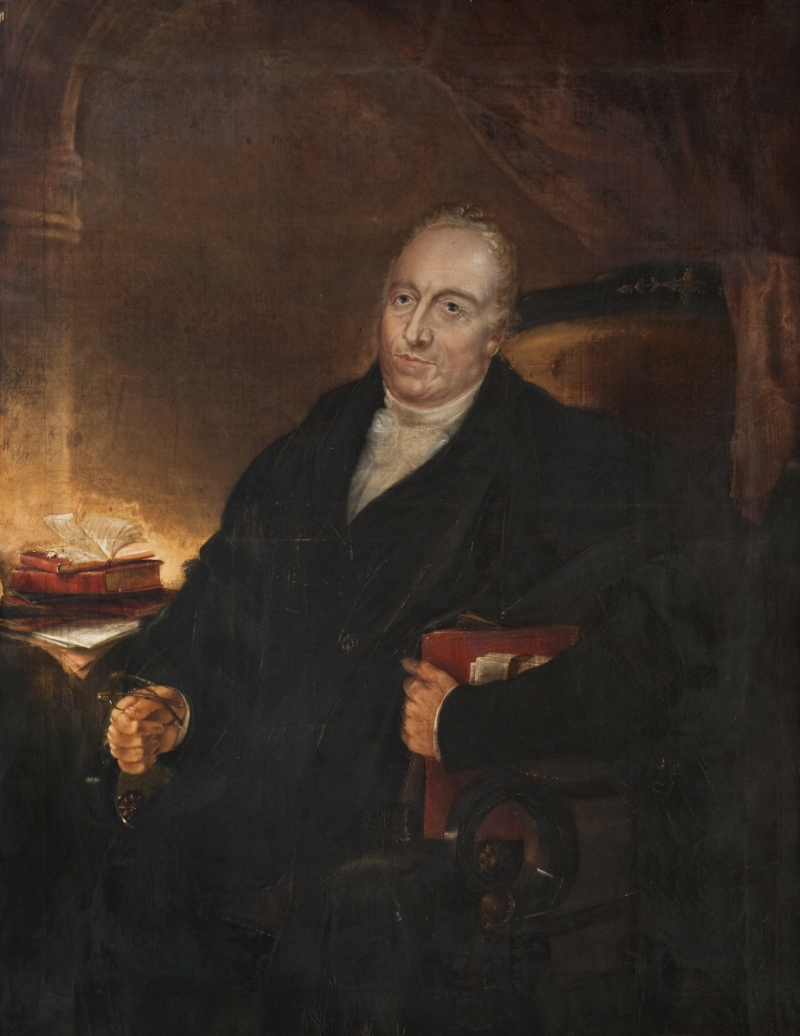
Professor John Young; 1750ish-1820 by Elizabeth Carmichael

Elizabeth Carmichael was an English portraitist active in London between 1768 and 1820.

== Life ==
Carmichael is known to have worked in oil and pastel. She exhibited at the Free Society in 1768; the Society of Artists of Great Britain from 1769 until 1771 and at the Royal Academy from 1777 until 1789. Twice when exhibiting in the 1760s she gave an address in Newport Street; she also lived in Bentinck Street during her career. She is likely the artist to whom Benjamin West gave permission, in an 1818 letter, to copy his sketches. A half-length portrait by Carmichael of John Young of the University of Glasgow is today in the collection of the Hunterian Art Gallery.
