= Donald James Allan =

British classical scholar

Donald James Allan, FBA (22 December 1907 – 19 June 1978) was a British classical scholar. He was Professor of Greek at the University of Glasgow from 1957 to 1971. Allan was educated at Christ's Hospital School and then at Christ Church, Oxford. During the Second World War he worked at Bletchley Park.

== Selected publications ==
- Aristotle, De Caelo, 1936. (Editor)
- Plato, The Republic, 1940. (Editor)
- "Mediaeval Versions of Aristotle, De Caelo, and of the Commentary of Simplicius" in Mediaeval and Renaissance Studies, Vol. 2 (1950), pp. 82–120.
- The Philosophy of Aristotle, Oxford University Press, 1952. (Home University Library of Modern Knowledge No. 222)
