= George Baird (minister) =

Scottish minister, educational reformer and linguist

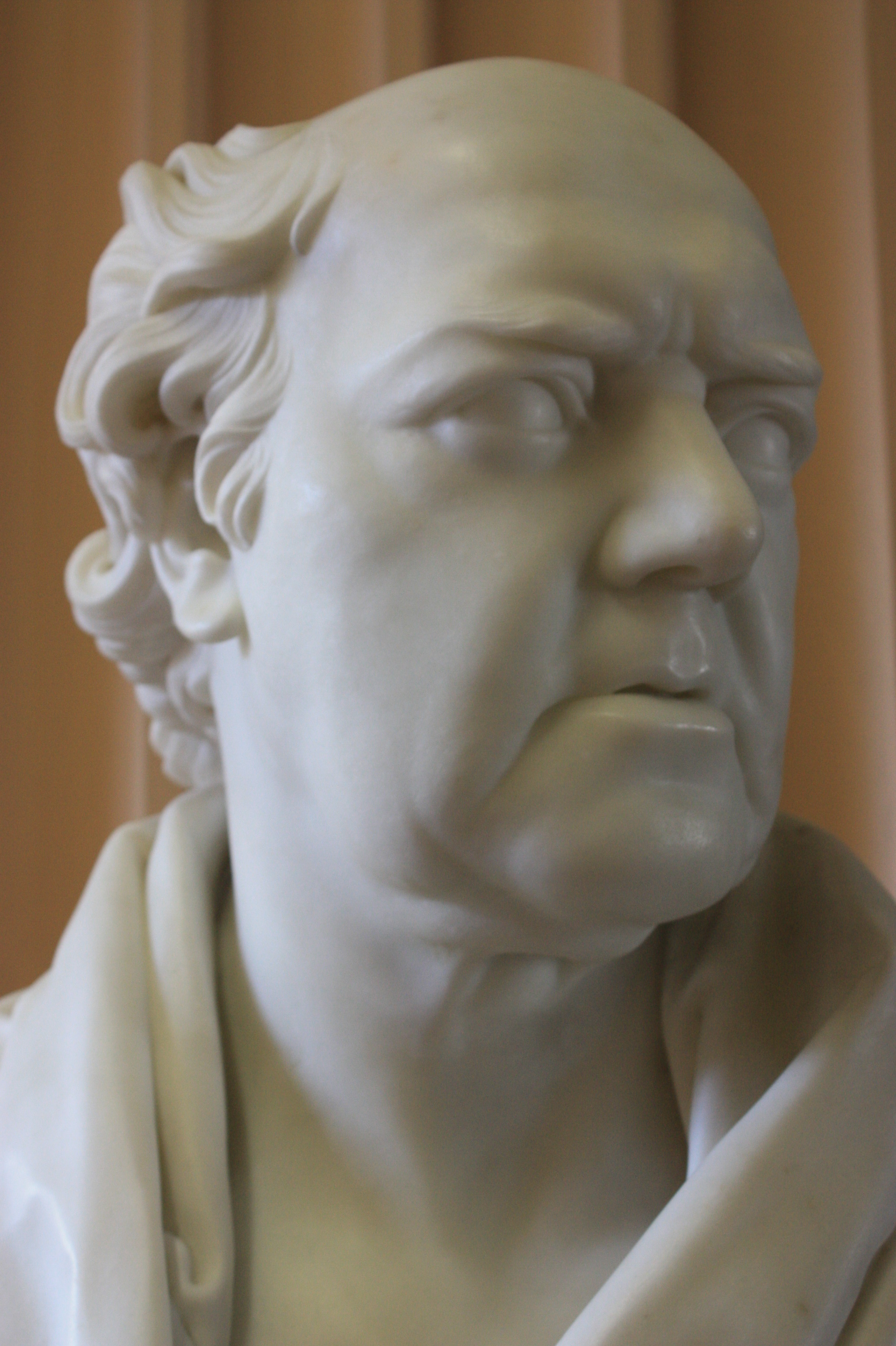
- Bust of George Husband Baird, c.1830, Old College, University of Edinburgh
- Born: 13 July 1761; Bo'ness, West Lothian, Scotland
- Died: 14 January 1840 (aged 78)
- Education: Edinburgh University
- Spouse: Isabella
- Children: Marion (daughter)

Ecclesiastical career
- Church: Church of Scotland
- Ordained: 1787

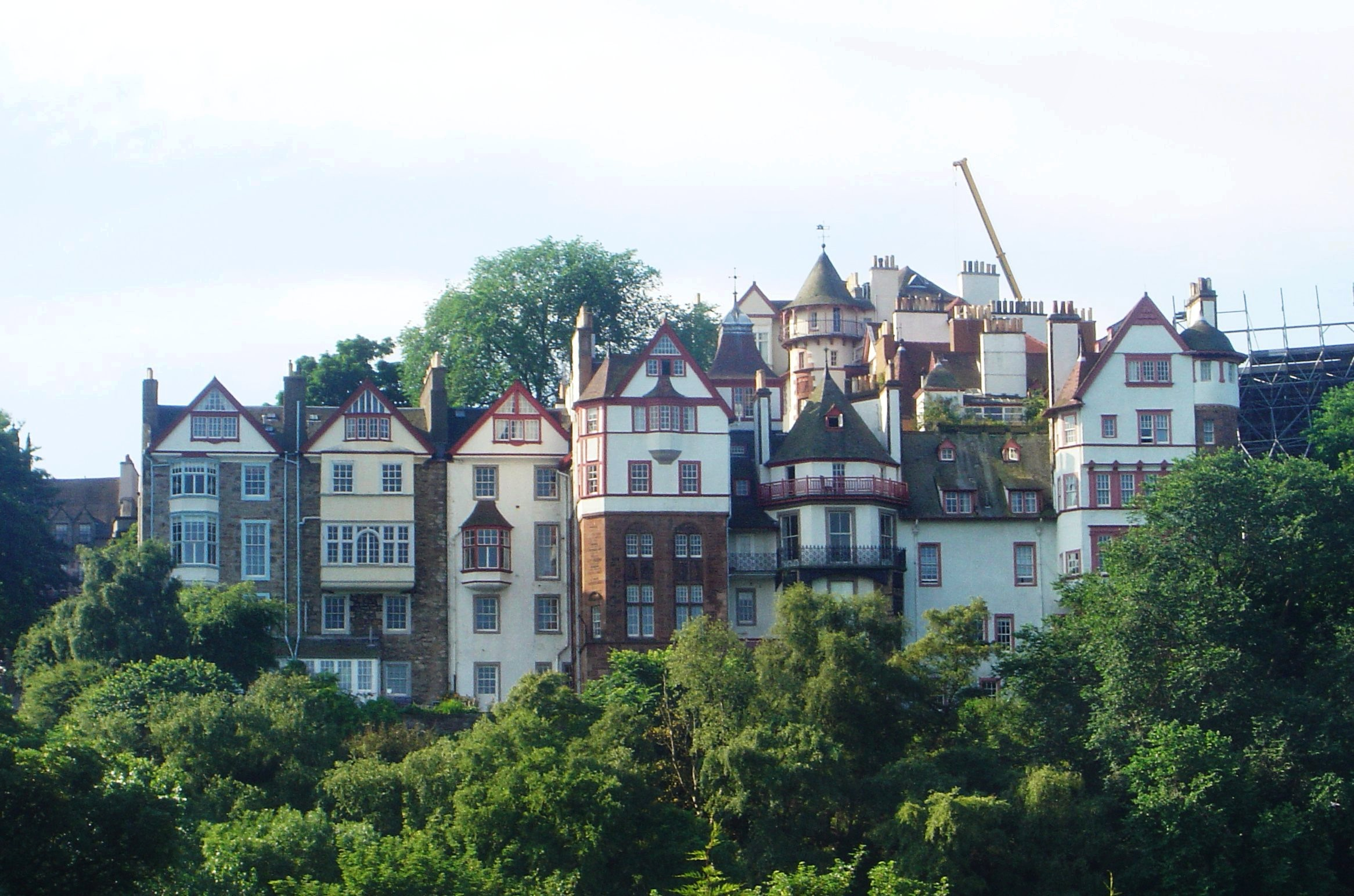
Ramsay Gardens

George Husband Baird FRSE FSAScot (13 July 1761 – 14 January 1840) was a Scottish minister, educational reformer, linguist and the Principal of the University of Edinburgh from 1793 to 1840. In 1800 he served as Moderator of the Church of Scotland General Assembly.

== Early life ==
Baird was born in 1761 at Inveravon Farm in the parish of Bo'ness in West Lothian. His father, James Baird, a landowner in Stirlingshire, at that time rented this farm from the Duke of Hamilton. Baird attended the parish school in Bo'ness, before being sent to the grammar school at Linlithgow. At age 12, Baird entered Edinburgh University as a student in humanities (Latin and Greek). There he made some independent linguistic researches, with James Finlayson and Josiah Walker.

To pay for his university studies he became tutor to the family of Colonel Blair of Blair in 1784. He was licensed to preach as a Church of Scotland minister in 1786 by the Presbytery of Linlithgow. He graduated MA from Edinburgh University in March 1787 aged 25.

== Career ==
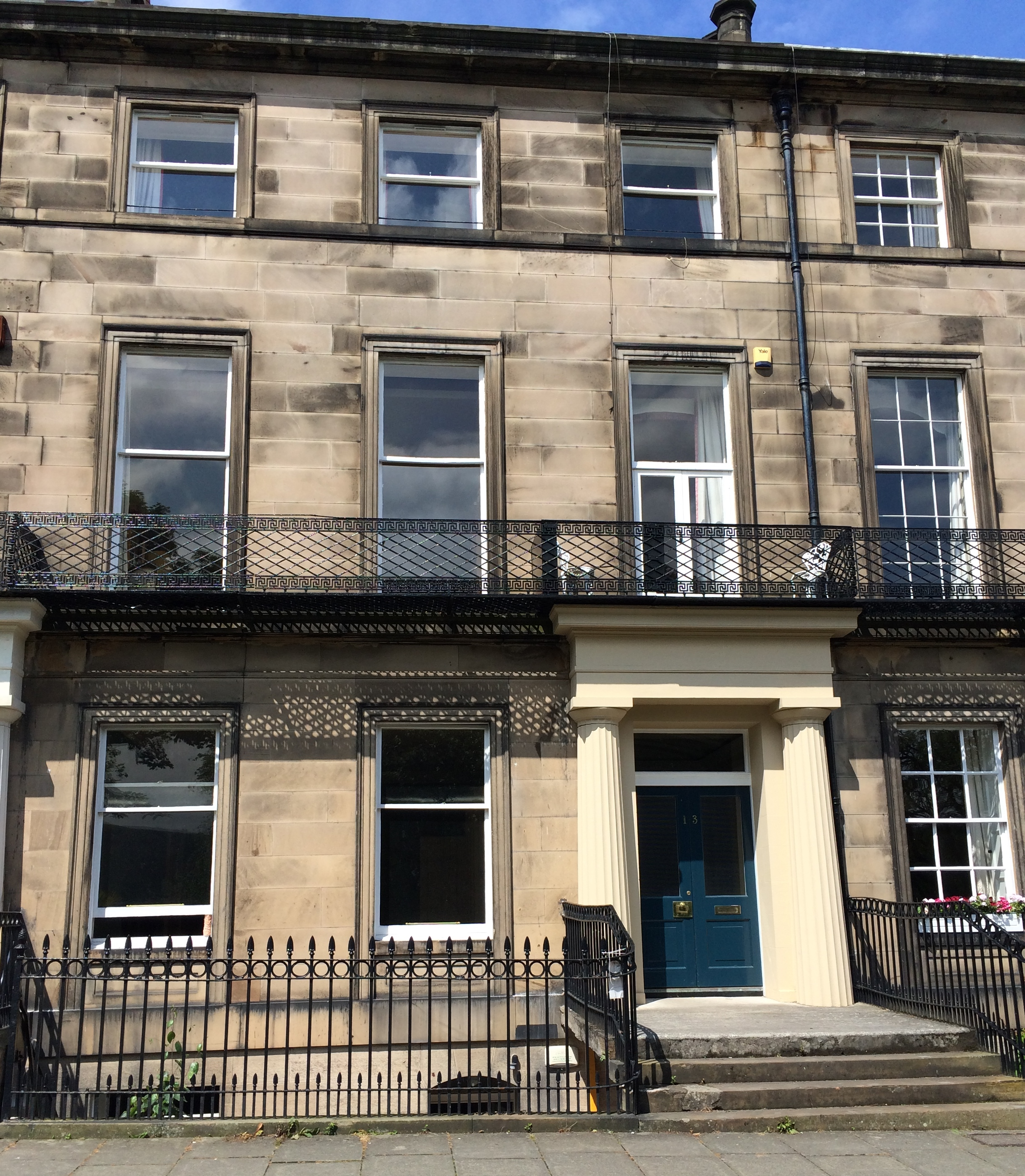
13 Regent Terrace, Edinburgh, home of George Husband Baird

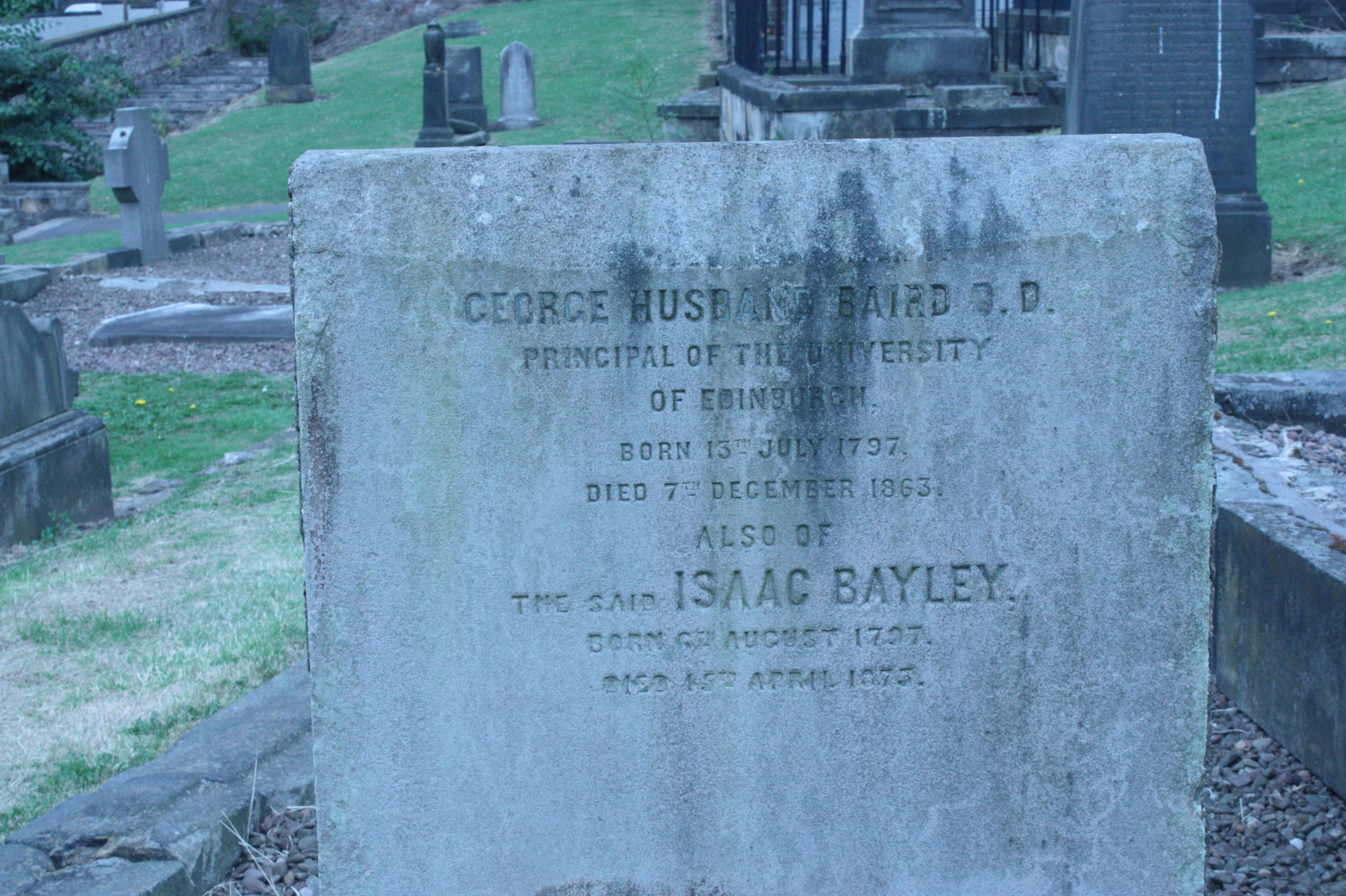
Grave of George Husband Baird, New Calton Cemetery

Baird was ordained minister of Dunkeld in April 1787, soon after his graduation.

In 1799 he translated from Greyfriars to the New (West) Kirk in St Giles.

His election to a prominent position was said to be a result of the influence of his father-in-law, Thomas Elder of Forneth, the Lord Provost of Edinburgh, whose eldest daughter had married Baird some years previously. It is reputed to have been jocularly said that Baird's chief claim to the Principalship was as "Husband" of the Lord Provost's daughter. Nevertheless, Baird held the Principalship for the long period of 47 years. The number of students at the University increased from 1,000 to 2,000 while he held this position and the Old College buildings were completed. In 1810, before these new buildings were built, it was reported that 24 professors shared 11 rooms and two professors had to teach by candlelight even in the middle of the day.

In his parallel career in the ministry in 1801 Baird moved from New (West) Parish to the High Kirk parish still within St Giles (it contained four parishes at this time).

In 1800, Baird was elected as Moderator of the General Assembly of the Church of Scotland. Baird was the founder and first convenor of the Highlands and Islands committee of the General Assembly. While on this committee he got the General assembly to agree to his project to educate the poor people in the highlands and islands of Scotland - in particular the Celts.

== Later years ==
Towards the close of his life, Baird put much effort into a scheme for the education of the poor in the Highlands and Islands of Scotland. He submitted his proposals to the General Assembly of the Church of Scotland in May 1824. Next year the Assembly gave its sanction to the scheme, and it was launched.

Through his influence Andrew Bell, of Madras, bequeathed £5000 for education in the Highlands of Scotland.

Baird was also known as a correspondent of the Scottish poet Robert Burns.

After his wife Isabella's death, Baird lived with his daughter Marion and son-in-law Isaac Bayley (1797-1873) at 13 Regent Terrace (note - the Post Office Directory states 12 Regent Terrace), Edinburgh from 1827. He died there in 1840, and is buried a short distance from the house, at New Calton Cemetery.

A memorial also exists near his family property at Manuel near Linlithgow, in Muiravonside Churchyard.

== Family ==
In August 1792 he married Isabella Elder eldest daughter of Thomas Elder the Lord Provost of the city. They had children:

- Emelia Husband Baird (b.1793) died in infancy
- Thomas Elder Baird (1795-1876) an advocate
- Marion Spottiswood Baird (b.1796) married Isaac Bayley of Manuel SSC in 1823. Their daughter Marion Spottiswood Bayley was mother to Isaac Bayley Balfour
- James Baird (1799-1823)
- Emelia Husband Baird (1801-1824)

== Legacy ==
- Baird House in Pollock Halls of Residence is named after him.

== Publications ==
- The Universal Propagation and Influence of the Christian Religion (1795) only 48 copies printed
- The Poems of Michael Bruce (1799)

== See also ==
- University of Edinburgh
- Pollock Halls of Residence
- List of moderators of the General Assembly of the Church of Scotland
- Greyfriars Kirk

| Preceded by William Robertson | Edinburgh University Principals; 1793–1840 | Succeeded by John Lee |

Church of Scotland titles
| Preceded by William Moodie | Moderator of the General Assembly of the Church of Scotland; 1799 | Succeeded by William Ritchie |
