= John Young (professor of Greek) =

Scottish professor of Greek (1747–1820)

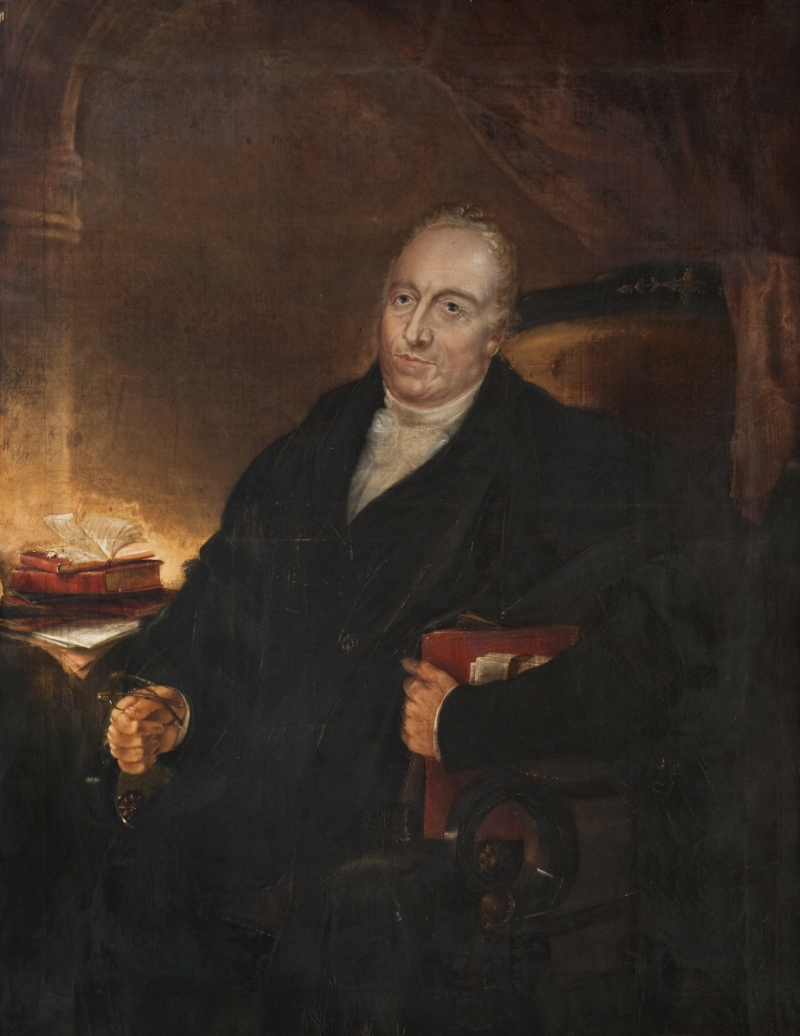
- by Elizabeth Carmichael
- Born: 27 January 1747; Glasgow, Scotland
- Died: 18 November 1820 (aged 73); Glasgow, Scotland
- Occupation: Academic
- Employer: University of Glasgow
- Spouse: Jean Lamont
- Children: seven
- Honours: FRSE

John Young FRSE (27 January 1747 – 18 November 1820) was an 18th/19th century professor of Greek at the University of Glasgow from 1774 to 1820 (listing many figures of the Scottish Enlightenment amongst his students), and joint founder of the Royal Society of Edinburgh. He was affectionately known as Cocky Bung (alluding to his father's job as a cooper).

== Life ==
Young was born in Glasgow on 27 January 1747, the second son of John Young, a cooper.

In 1764, he entered the University of Glasgow graduating with an MA in 1769. He then became an assistant to Prof James Moor. He succeeded Moor as professor of Greek in 1774 aged 27. He was Clerk of the University Senate from 1779, and Curator of the College Chambers from 1781.

On 9 June 1774 he became professor of Greek at the university, and proved an efficient and popular teacher. Thomas Campbell (1777–1844) remembered him as "a man of great humour", ready to laugh heartily with his students over the whimsicalities of Lucian and Aristophanes (Beattie, Life and Letters of Campbell, i. 159). Captain Hamilton eulogises his scholarship and oratory, comparing his energetic sympathy with that of Burke (Cyril Thornton, chap. vii.). Wilson dedicated to Young and his colleague George Jardine "The Isle of Palms and other Poems", 1812, and, writing of "Homer and his Translators", he recalls how Young's reading of the Iliad "gave life to every line" (Wilson, Works, viii. 36). A large portion of Letter lxviii. in "Peter's Letters to his Kinsfolk", vol. iii., is a eulogy of Young, with whose reading of Greek and his enthusiasm over the value of a particle or the sublimity of a poetical passage the writer was deeply impressed. A similar tribute occurs in Gleig's "Quarterly" article on Lockhart's "Life of Scott" (see Quarterly Review, lxxxv. 37, and Lang, Life and Letters of John Gibson Lockhart, i. 22). Young was devoted to the classical stage and an admirer of Edmund Kean.

Having been Professor of Greek for nearly half a century, Young died in Glasgow on 18 November 1820. A portion of his library was sold at auction (alongside 'a portion of another gentleman's library') by R. H. Evans in London on 18 April 1825 (and four following days). A copy of the catalogue is held at Cambridge University Library (shelfmark Munby.c.129(6)).

He is thought to have been buried with the other university professors at Blackfriars Churchyard, who were later re-interred in the "Professors Monument" in the Glasgow Necropolis.

== Family ==
On 25 Sept. 1780 Young married Jean Lamont, daughter of Colin Lamont of Knockdow, Argyleshire, who survived him with seven children.

Their eldest son, John (1781–1852), received the honorary degree of LLD from the University of Glasgow in 1810; was for a time chaplain of the East India Company; and died rector of Newdigate, Surrey, on 13 May 1852 (Gent. Mag. 1852, ii. 105). Charles, the fourth son (1796–1822), a classical scholar of great promise, died at Glasgow on 17 December 1822 (Foster, Alumni Oxon.; Gent. Mag. 1823, pt. i.).

Although Young's scholarship was mainly utilised in his class-room, he contributed some valuable notes to Dalziel's "Collectanea Græca Majora" (1820). His metrical translation of the "Odes" of Tyrtæus, and his jeu d'esprit after Dr Johnson on Gray's "Elegy", are not of much account.

== Artistic recognition ==
A half-length portrait of Young by Elizabeth Carmichael is today in the collection of the Hunterian Art Gallery.

== Sources ==
This article incorporates text from a publication now in the public domain: Bayne, Thomas Wilson (1900). "Young, John (1750?-1820)". In Lee, Sidney (ed.). Dictionary of National Biography. Vol. 63. London: Smith, Elder & Co. p. 380.
