= School of History, Classics and Archaeology, University of Edinburgh =

Academic department in Edinburgh, Scotland

Coordinates: 55°56′43″N 3°11′25″W

School of History, Classics and Archaeology The University of Edinburgh
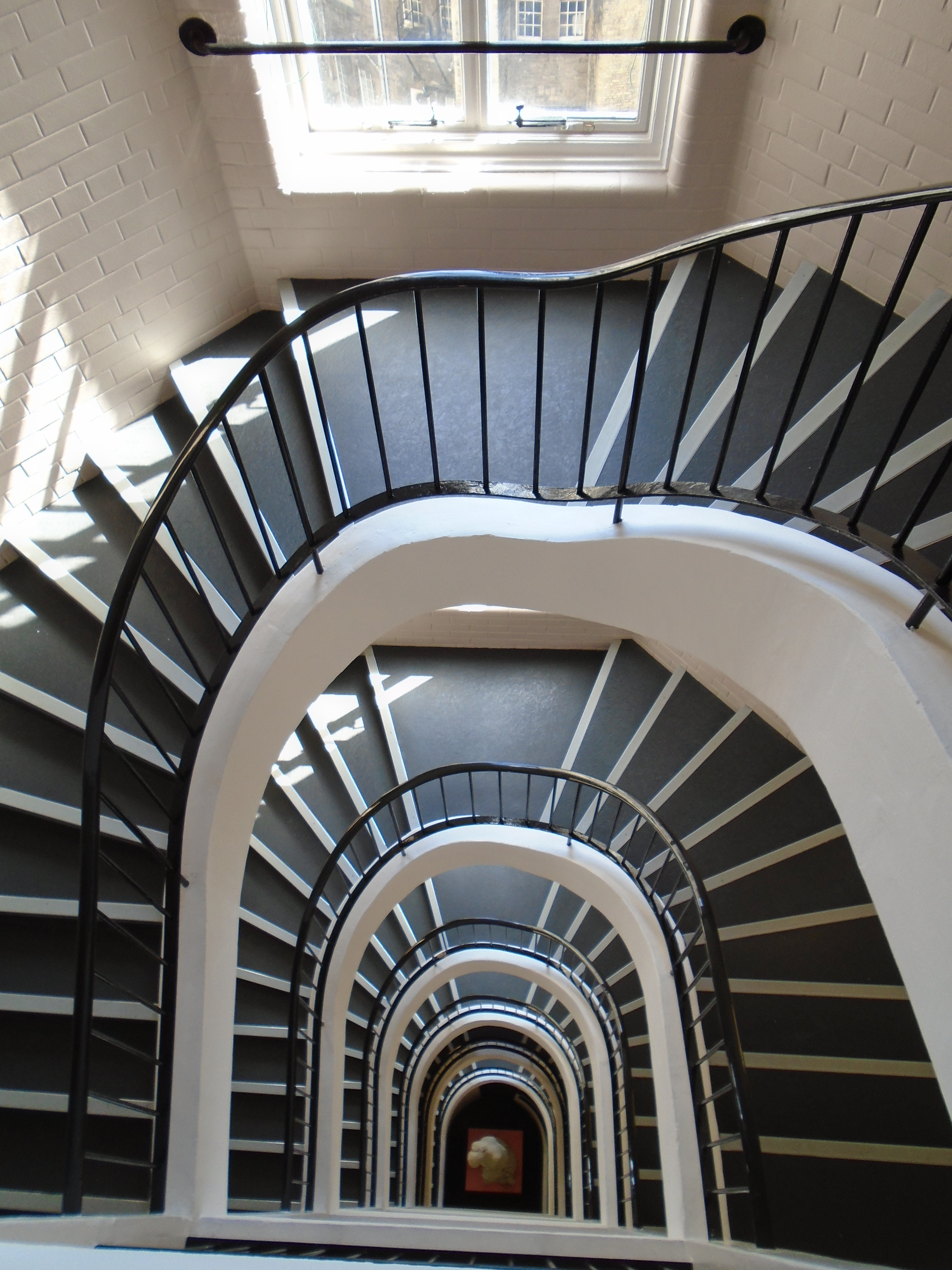
- The staircase leading to all floors in the School in the Medical Quad, Doorway 4
- Type: Public
- Affiliations: University of Edinburgh
- Academic staff: 150
- Students: 2,100
- Undergraduates: 1,500
- Postgraduates: 600
- Location: Edinburgh, United Kingdom
- Website: history-classics-archaeology

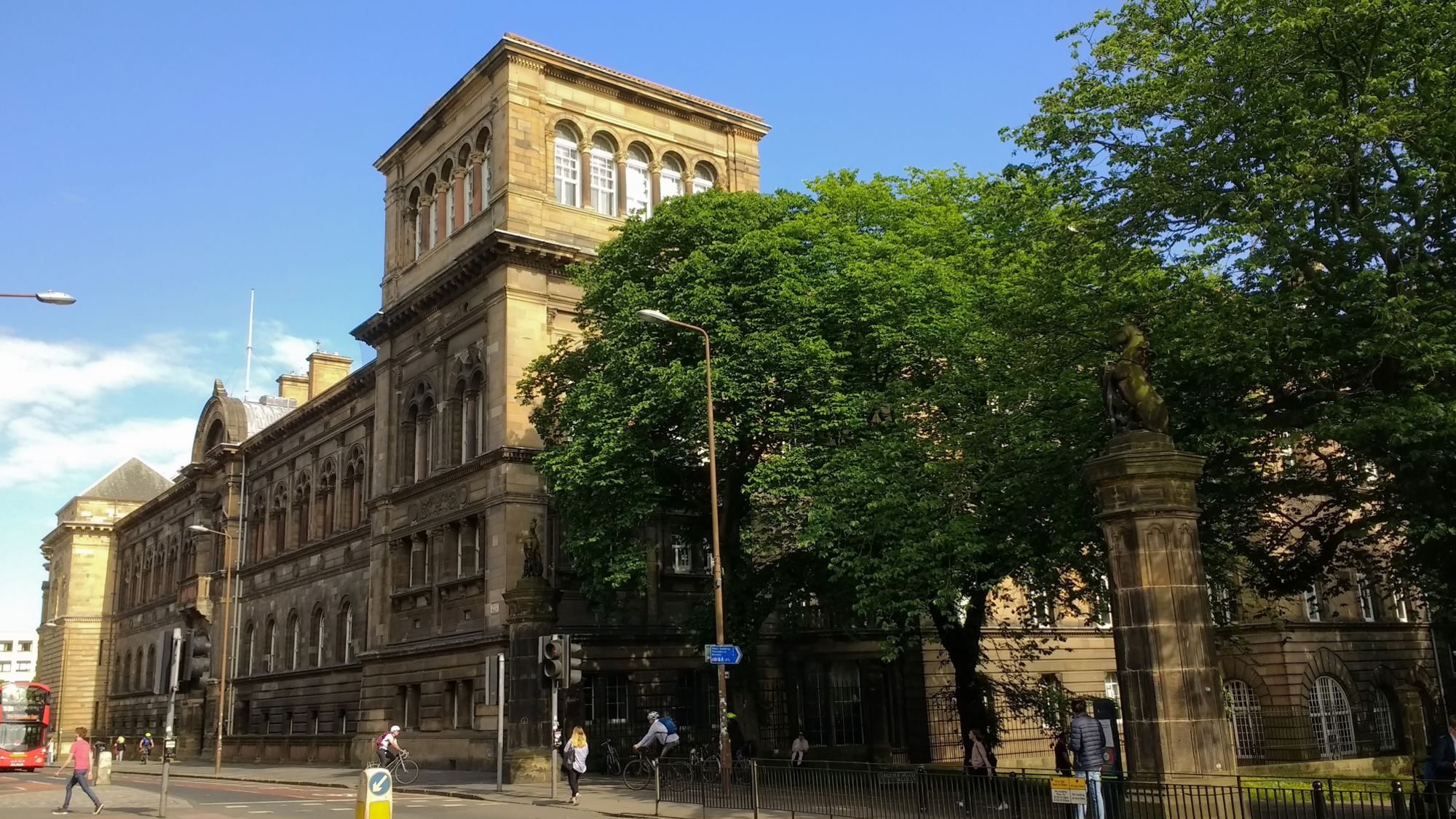
School of History, Classics and Archaeology

The School of History, Classics and Archaeology (HCA) is a department within the College of Arts, Humanities and Social Sciences at the University of Edinburgh in Scotland.

== History ==
Classics, formerly split between the departments of Humanity (Latin) and Greek, have been taught at the University since its foundation in 1583. The school has the oldest established Chair in Scottish History. Several well-known archaeologists have graduated and taught at the school. The department boasts an established Chair of Classics, instituted as the Professorships of Greek and Humanity (Latin) in 1708.

== Academics ==
The School is engaged in teaching and research in the three disciplines of history, classics and archaeology. It consists of three research centres:

- Centre for the Study of Modern and Contemporary History
- Edinburgh Centre for Global History
- Centre for Medieval and Renaissance Studies

The school has more than 150 academic and administrative staff and about 600 graduate students. The undergraduate population is close to 1,500, about a quarter of which are international students.

== Location ==
The school is located in the William Robertson Wing of the Old Medical School buildings on Teviot Place.

== Notable alumni and former staff ==
Notable members of Edinburgh University's School of History, Classics and Archaeology:

- Lord Abercromby – author of distinguished research on Bronze Age pottery
- Abercromby Professors of Archaeology
  - Vere Gordon Childe – first holder of the Abercromby Chair
  - Stuart Piggott – second holder of the Abercromby Chair
- Alexander F. Garvie – Emeritus Professor of Greek at the University of Glasgow and author of distinguished commentaries on Aeschylus' tragedies
- John Burnet – known for his commentaries on Plato and work on Pre-Socratic philosophy
- Nan Dunbar – appointed to a lectureship in 1952
- Dr Robert Munro – a distinguished medical practitioner and archaeologist
- Sir Tom Devine – Knighted for services to Scottish History
- Rt. Hon. Gordon Brown – former Prime Minister of the United Kingdom and Member of Parliament for Kirkcaldy and Cowdenbeath who also served as Chancellor
- Rt. Hon. Amber Rudd – former Member of Parliament for Hastings & Rye who served as Home Secretary and Secretary of State for Work and Pensions

== Publications ==
The School of History, Classics and Archaeology currently publishes the Journal of Lithic Studies.
