= William Richardson (classicist) =

Scottish classicist and literary scholar

William Richardson FRSE
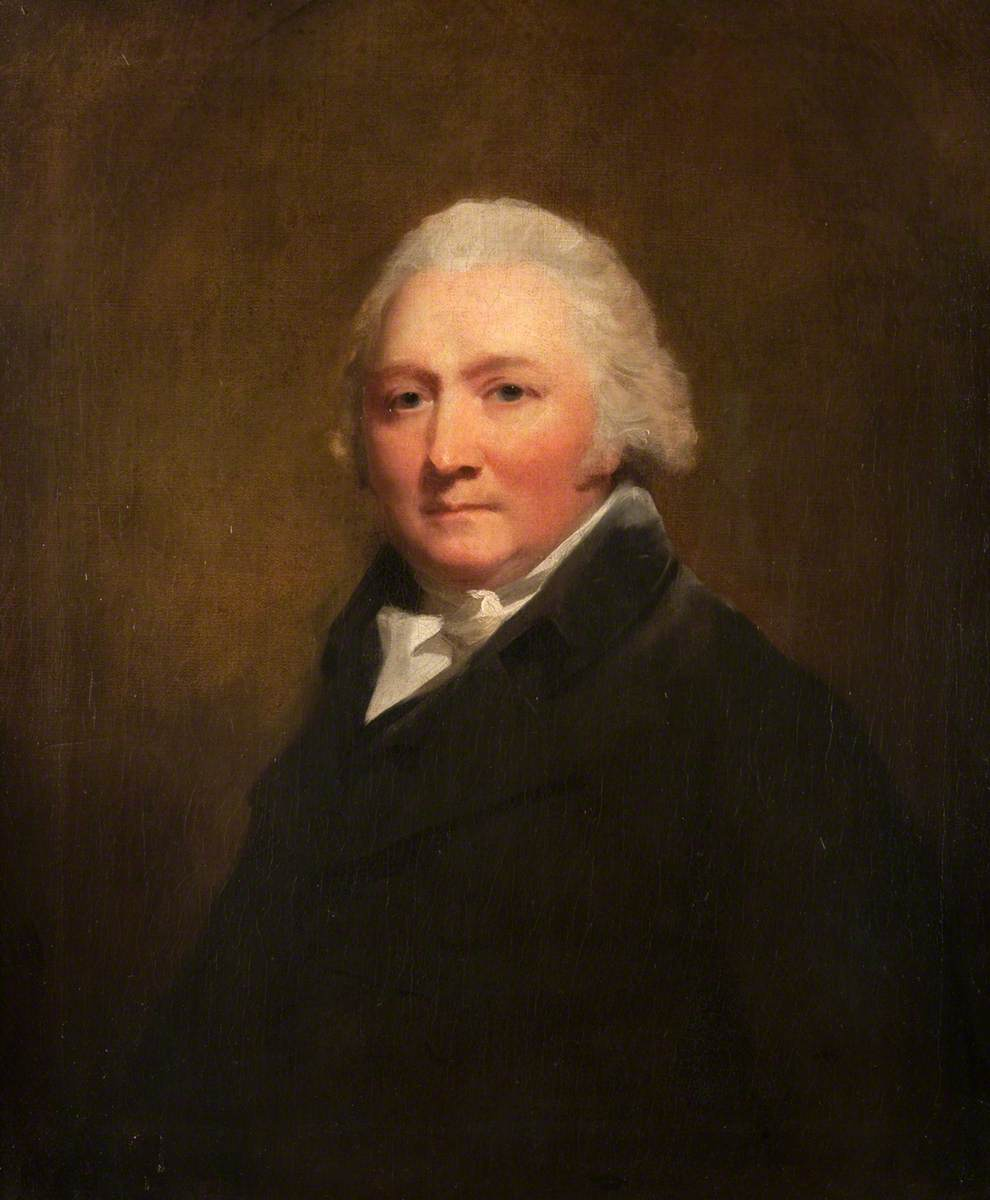
- Born: 1 October 1743; Aberfoyle, Stirling
- Died: 3 November 1814 (aged 71)
- Education: University of Glasgow

William Richardson FRSE (1 October 1743 – 3 November 1814) was a Scottish classicist and literary scholar. In 1783, he was a joint founder of the Royal Society of Edinburgh.

== Life ==
Born in Aberfoyle, Perthshire, he was the son of Rev. James Richardson, the Church of Scotland parish minister of the same parish in which William was first educated. William attended the University of Glasgow in 1757 where he focused on his talent for learning languages. He graduated MA from the university in 1763 and was employed by Charles Cathcart, 9th Lord Cathcart, as tutor to his two sons.

William travelled to Russia with the Cathcart family, after Lord Cathcart was appointed ambassador to Russia in 1768. It was during these travels that Richardson described Russia through a series of letters. He later had them published, in 1784, under the title Anecdotes of the Russian Empire; in a series of letters, written, a few years ago, from St. Petersburg. These letters would later go down as a very accurate detail of Russian society.

After returning to Scotland in 1772, Richardson was appointed professor of humanity at the University of Glasgow in 1773. With the ability to attract many great scholars, and also being a very popular lecturer, Glasgow became a prestigious institution. Richardson would also publish five works criticizing Shakespeare. Richardson was very interested in not only English literature, but he also read German, Italian, and French literature.

He died a single man in his lodgings at Glasgow University.

== Archives ==
The archives for William Richardson are maintained by the Archives of the University of Glasgow (GUAS).

== Sources ==
- Moss, Michael S. (October 2009) [2004]. "Richardson, William (1743–1814)". Oxford Dictionary of National Biography. Oxford Dictionary of National Biography (Online ed.). Oxford University Press. doi:10.1093/ref:odnb/23590. (Subscription, Wikipedia Library access or UK public library membership required.)
