= Classical Association of Scotland =

The association logo.

The Classical Association of Scotland is a learned society founded in 1902. It brings together researchers in classical studies throughout Scotland and holds regular meetings.

Professor Douglas Cairns of the University of Edinburgh is its chairman of council. Some older records of the association are held by Glasgow University Archive Services.

Douglas MacDowell was chair from 1976 to 1982.
