= John Swinnerton Phillimore =

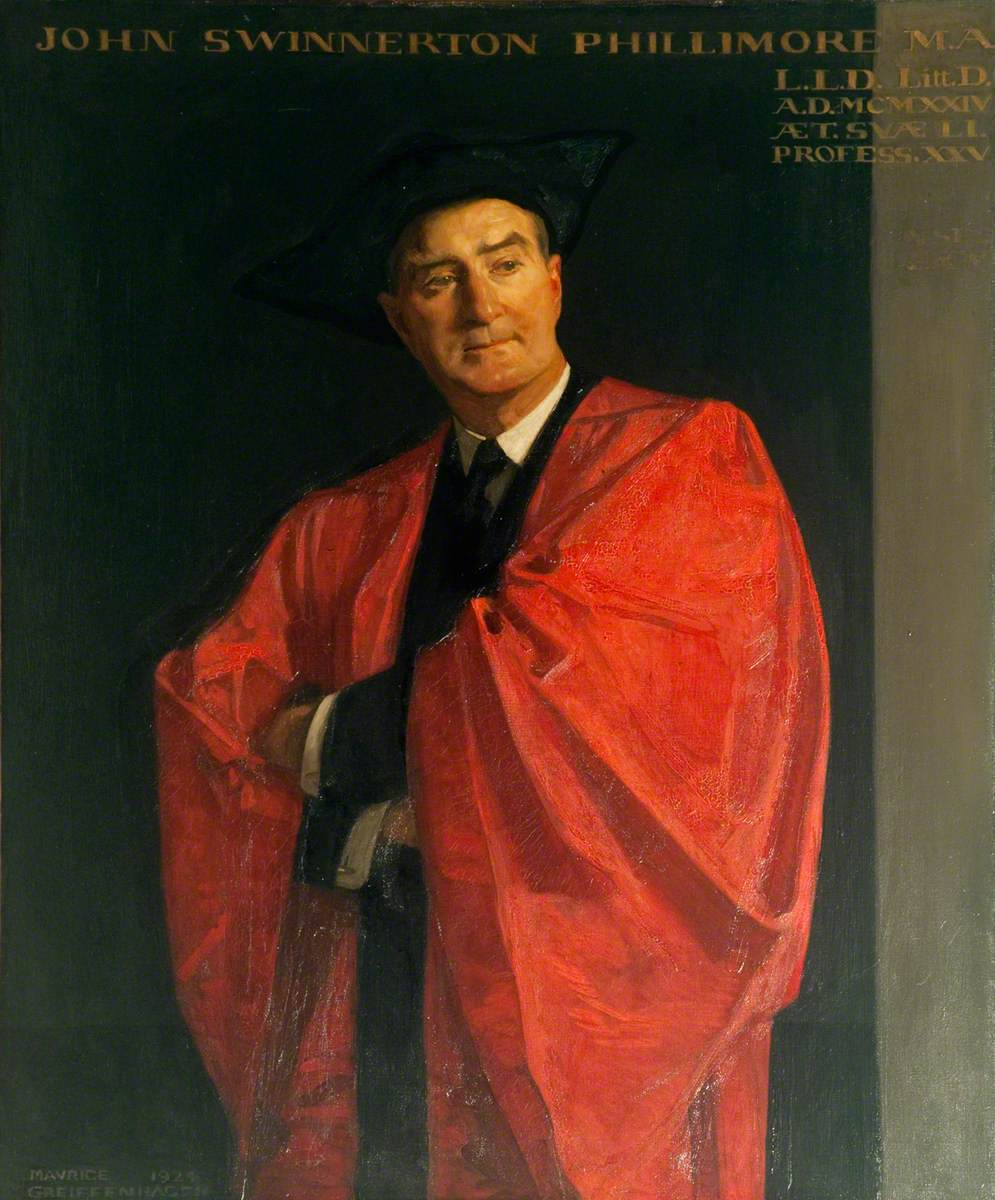

John Swinnerton Phillimore (26 February 1873 – 16 November 1926) was a British classical scholar, translator, and poet.

Born at Boconnoc in Cornwall, Phillimore was, like his father Augustus Phillimore before him, and four brothers, educated at Westminster School (1886-91), where he was a Queen's Scholar, before going on to read Literae Humaniores at Christ Church, Oxford, where he was also President of the Oxford Union. After taking his degree, he remained at Christ Church as a Student (Fellow and Tutor) until 1899, when he was made Professor of Greek at the University of Glasgow; in 1906 he became Professor of Humanity there, a position he held until his death. Though he was invited to give the Sather Lectures at the University of California, Berkeley, he was unable to do so because of the First World War. Phillimore was a convert to Roman Catholicism.

== Works ==
- Poems. Glasgow: James MacLehose & Sons, 1902
- The Athenian Drama, vol. ii, Sophocles. London: George Allen & Unwin, Ltd., 1902
- Propertius. Oxford: Clarendon Press, 1906
- Things New and Old. London: Humphrey Milford, 1918
- Some Remarks on Translation and Translators. Oxford: The English Association, 1919
- The Hundred Best Latin Hymns. Glasgow: Gowans & Gray, 1926
