= Alexander F. Garvie =

Scottish classicist (1934–2024)

Alexander F. Garvie FRSE
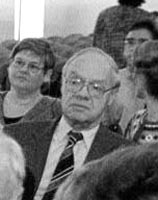
- Born: 29 January 1934; Edinburgh
- Died: 17 September 2024; Glasgow
- Occupation: Professor of classics (personal chair)
- Spouse: Jane Wallace Johnstone

Academic background
- Education: George Watson's College; University of Edinburgh (MA); Gonville and Caius College, Cambridge (MA)
- Doctoral advisor: Denys Page

Academic work
- Discipline: Classics
- Sub-discipline: Greek Tragedy; Aeschylus
- Institutions: University of Glasgow
- Doctoral students: Douglas Cairns

Alexander Femister Garvie (1934–2024) was a Scottish Classicist and Emeritus Professor of Classics at the University of Glasgow. Garvie's career at Glasgow spanned 39 years across the Departments of Greek and Classics, rising from Assistant Lecturer in 1960 to Professor of Classics in 1998. He is best known for his commentaries on Aeschylus, and especially for his seminal commentary on Aeschylus' Choephori.

== Early life ==
Garvie was born in Edinburgh in 1934 to Alexander Garvie, an office manager at McEwan's brewery, and Edith Tyson, a secretary at the law firm Shepherd and Wedderburn. He received his education at George Watson's College. It was at George Watson's that Garvie was first taught Greek when the Classics Master, John 'Iky' Penman, announced that selected pupils would be giving up science to take up Greek. Garvie was joint Dux of the school.

== Career ==
Garvie graduated from the University of Edinburgh in 1955 with an MA (First Class) in Classics. At Edinburgh, he was especially influenced by the Professor of Greek A. J. Beattie and, at Beattie's suggestion, he applied for and won a scholarship to Gonville and Caius College, Cambridge. His education was then interrupted by two years of National Service in Germany and Cyprus, where he learnt Modern Greek. Garvie went up to Cambridge in 1957 and lodged in his third year with Frances Cornford, widow of F. M. Cornford and granddaughter of Charles Darwin (also an Edinburgh and Cambridge alumnus). Historically, it was typical for Scottish graduates to take a second first degree at either Oxford or Cambridge, and Garvie was ultimately awarded firsts in both parts of the Classical Tripos.

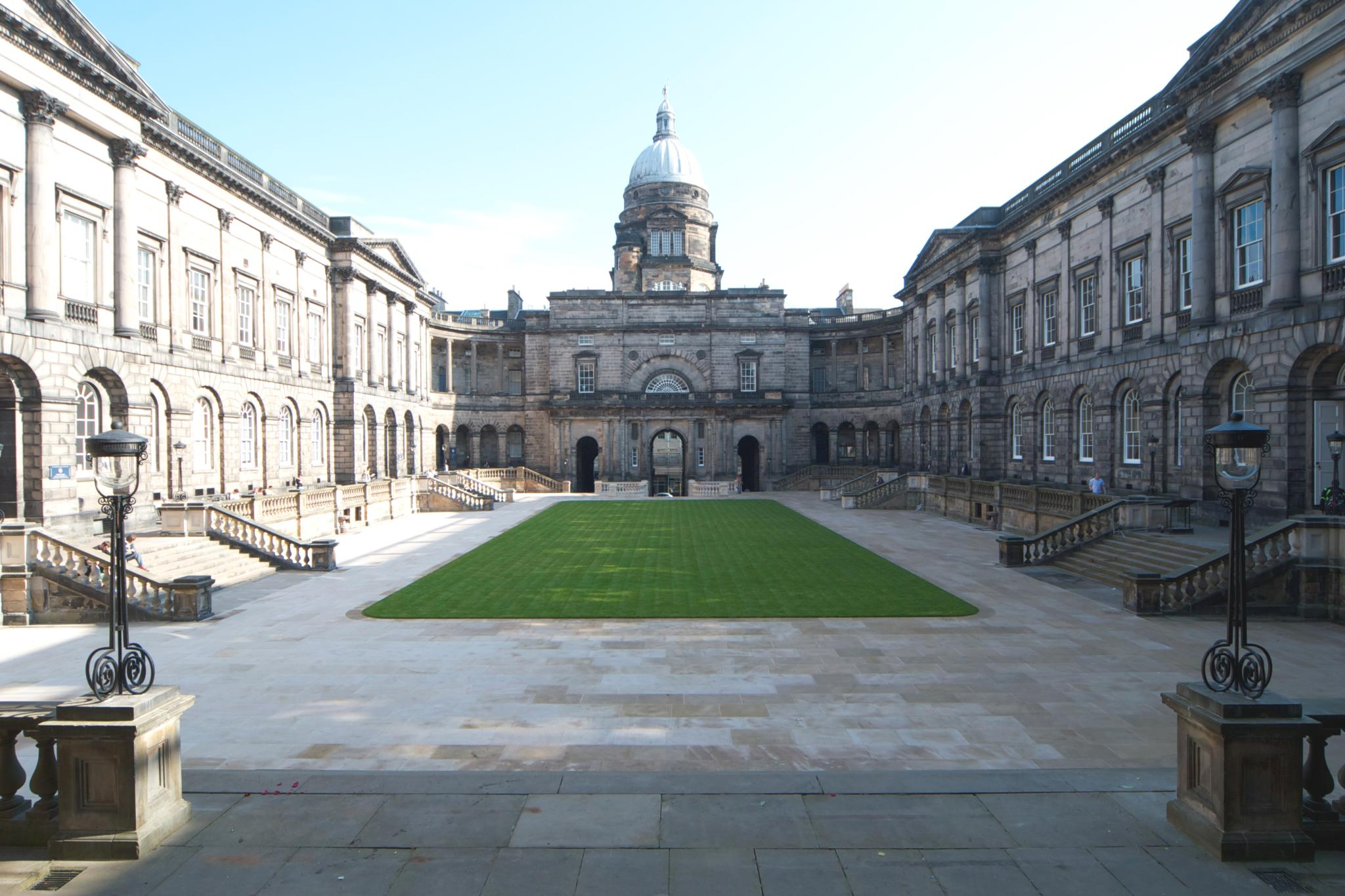
Old College of the University of Edinburgh, where the Classics department was housed until 1965.

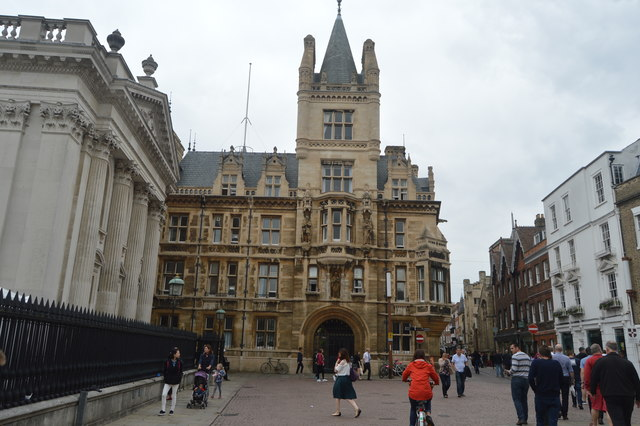
Gonville and Caius, Cambridge.

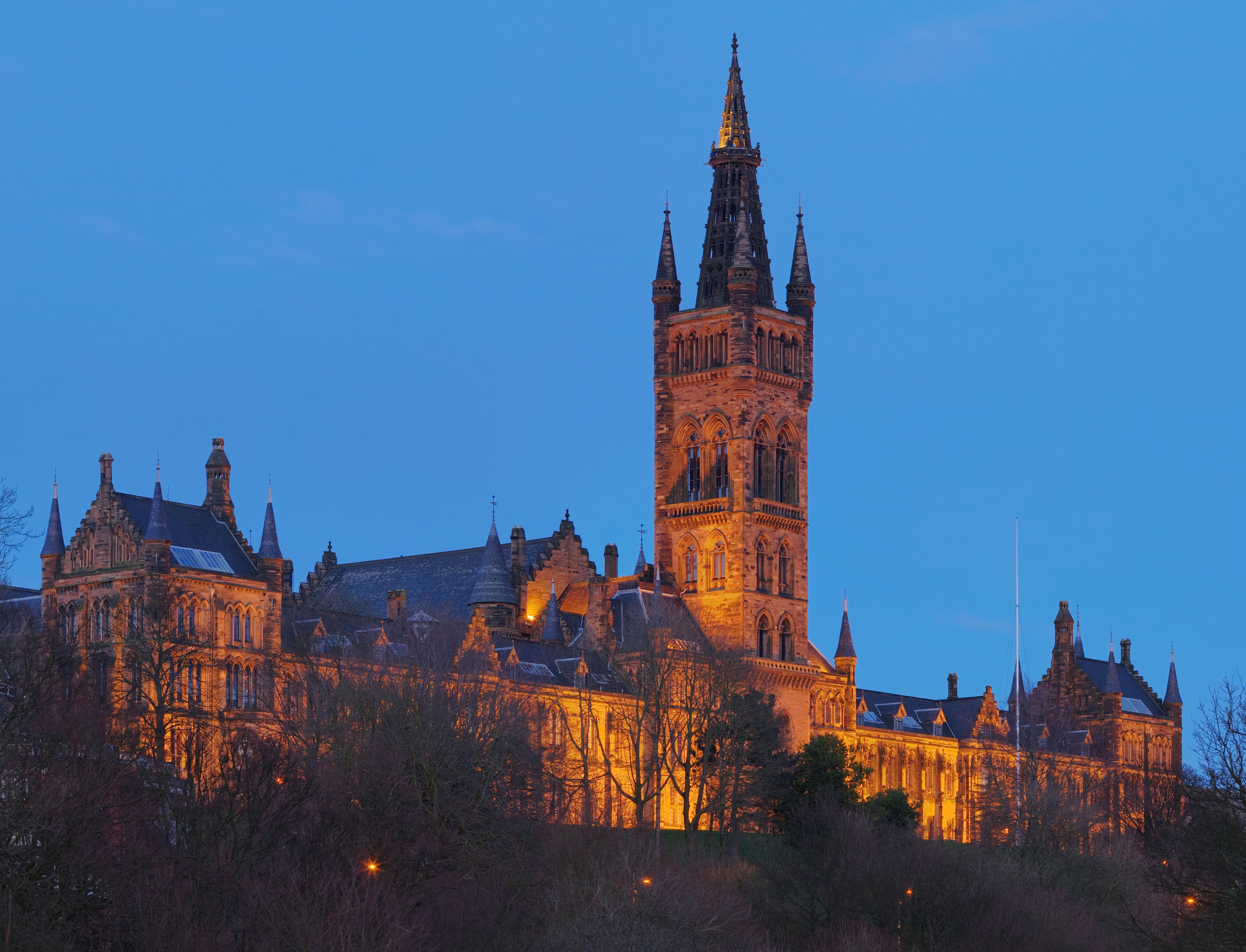
The University of Glasgow, where Garvie taught for his entire career.

At Cambridge, Garvie attended Denys Page’s lectures on Greek textual criticism, which were based on Aeschylus’ Persae. Page suggested to Garvie that he embark on PhD research on the dating of Aeschylus' Suppliants. Page supervised Garvie's work, which would later be published as Aeschylus’ Supplices: Play and trilogy (Cambridge, 1969), but Garvie never formally completed the PhD as he had secured employment as an Assistant Lecturer in Greek at the University of Glasgow, being one of the first appointments made by the new Professor of Greek, A. W. Gomme’s successor, D. J. Allan.

Garvie died on 17 September 2024 at the age of 90.

== Research fellowships and accolades ==
Garvie was Gillespie Professor at the College of Wooster, Ohio, and a Visiting Professor at Ohio State University, and the University of Guelph, Ontario. He served for six years as editor of the Classical Review, and seventeen years as secretary, and then as chairman, of the Classical Association Journals Board.

He was a Fellow of the Royal Society of Edinburgh.

A Festschrift was published in his honour in 2006, entitled Dionysalexandros: Essays on Aeschylus and his fellow tragedians in honour of Alexander F. Garvie, and featured contributions from Oliver Taplin, Jean Bollack, Martin Hose, Martin West, Hugh Lloyd-Jones, P. E. Easterling, Douglas Cairns, and Elizabeth Craik.

== Scholarship ==
Garvie's work focussed on the Greek tragedian Aeschylus, on whom he published highly regarded commentaries of his Persae, Supplices, and the definitive commentary of his Choephori, once described as an 'indispensable vademecum for any serious student of Aeschylus'. Notably, alongside traditional philological approaches, Garvie's Choephori commentary was one of the earliest works to apply Anne Lebeck's theories of a unified imagistic structure to the Oresteia. Additionally, Garvie published commentaries on Sophocles' Ajax and Homer's Odyssey books 6–8.

== Personal life ==
Garvie was active in the Church of Scotland, where he taught in the Cadder parish church Sunday school, sang in the choir, and served as session clerk for ten years. Garvie was an accomplished violinist, playing in the University of Glasgow orchestra for more than 40 years. He also enjoyed climbing.

== Selected works ==
- Garvie, A. F. (1969), Aeschylus’ Supplices: Play and trilogy, Cambridge University Press, viii + 279.
- Garvie, A. F. (1970), ‘The opening of the Choephori’, Bulletin of the Institute of Classical Studies 17, 79–91.
- Garvie, A. F. (1986), Aeschylus, Choephori: With introduction and commentary, Oxford, Clarendon Press, lx + 394.
- Garvie, A. F. (1994), Homer, Odyssey Books VI–VIII, edited with Introduction and Commentary, Cambridge, Cambridge University Press, viii + 368.
- Garvie, A. F. (1998), Sophocles, Ajax: Edited with introduction, translation and commentary, Warminster, Aris & Phillips, vi + 266.
- Garvie, A. F. (2009), Aeschylus: Persae: with Introduction and Commentary, Oxford, OUP.
