= Douglas MacDowell =

British classical scholar (1931–2010)

Douglas MacDowell FRSE FBA
- Born: 8 March 1931
- Died: 17 January 2010 (aged 78)

Academic background
- Education: Balliol College, Oxford

Academic work
- Discipline: Classics
- Sub-discipline: Ancient Greek; Attic orators; Ancient Greek law
- Institutions: University of Manchester; University of Glasgow
- Doctoral students: Douglas Cairns

Douglas Maurice MacDowell (8 March 1931 – 17 January 2010) was a British classical scholar. His early career was as a teacher, first in the British Army as part of his national service and then at two private schools. He then moved into academia and was a lecturer at the University of Manchester. Finally, for thirty years, he was Professor of Greek at the University of Glasgow.

== Early life ==
MacDowell was born on 8 March 1931. He was brought up as an only child in London, England. He was educated Elgin Academy, Moray and Madras College, St Andrews (while his father was posted to Scotland with the Royal Air Force during the Second World War) and then at Highgate School in London. He applied to the University of Oxford, against the wishes of his school, and won a place.

MacDowell left school early, March 1949, to undertake his national service: it had been expanded from 12 months to 18 months, and he was due to start his degree in autumn 1950. Following completion of the British Army's basic training, he was promoted to sergeant instructor and posted to the Army Apprentices School in Chepstow where he spent the rest of his time in uniform teaching English to young soldiers.

Having been awarded the Domus Exhibition, MacDowell studied classics at Balliol College, Oxford. His tutors included W. S. Watt, Kenneth Dover and Russell Meiggs. He achieved a first class in both Mods and Greats, and graduated with a Bachelor of Arts (BA) degree in 1954.

== Career ==
MacDowell was originally discouraged from entering academia and so he sat the civil service exam: he failed the interview section. His early career was as a school teacher, and he taught classics at Allhallows School and then Merchant Taylors' School.

In 1958, MacDowell decided he wanted to move into academia. After initial rejections, he was appointed an assistant lecturer at the University of Manchester. He was promoted to lecturer in 1961, senior lecturer in 1968 and reader in 1970. He was also a visiting fellow at Merton College, Oxford in 1969.

In 1971, at the age of 40, MacDowell was selected as the next Professor of Greek at the University of Glasgow. He introduced courses on Ancient Greek civilisation which did not require knowledge of the language and the teaching of ancient Greek from scratch. He was chair of the Classical Association of Scotland from 1976 to 1982. Fearful of the cuts to classics that were happening throughout British universities, he stayed on in his chair until he reached the compulsory retirement age of 70: he was right, and the university did not appoint a replacement.

== Personal life ==
MacDowell died on 17 January 2010, aged 78. In his will, he left the University of Glasgow £2 million to support the teaching of classics. In his honour, the university endowed the re-established chair in Greek as the MacDowell Professor of Greek.

MacDowell never married nor had any children.

== Honours ==
In 1991 MacDowell was elected a Fellow of the Royal Society of Edinburgh (FRSE), Scotland's national academy. In 1993 he was elected a Fellow of the British Academy (FBA), the United Kingdom's national academy for the humanities and social sciences.

In 2004, a Festschrift was published in MacDowell's honour titled "Law, Rhetoric and Comedy in Classical Athens: Essays in Honour of Douglas M. MacDowell" and edited by Douglas Cairns and R. Knox.

== Selected works ==
- MacDowell, Douglas M. (1978). The Law in Classical Athens. Ithaca, NY: Cornell University Press. ISBN 978-0801411984.
- MacDowell, D. M. (1986). Spartan Law. Edinburgh: Scottish Academic Press. ISBN 978-0707304700.
- MacDowell, Douglas M. (1995). Aristophanes and Athens: an introduction to the plays. Oxford: Oxford University Press. ISBN 978-0198721581.
- MacDowell, Douglas M. (2009). Demosthenes the orator. Oxford: Oxford University Press. ISBN 978-0199287192.
