= MacDowell Professor of Greek =

The Professorship of Greek is a chair at the University of Glasgow. Since 2012, the chair has been named the MacDowell Professor of Greek, in recognition of a bequest by Douglas MacDowell.

== History ==
Under the Nova Erectio of King James VI of Scotland the teaching of Greek at the University of Glasgow in Scotland was the responsibility of the Regents (university teachers). From 1581 one of the Regents was sometimes given the title Professor of Greek. The Professorship was more formally established in 1704.

Following the retirement of Douglas MacDowell in 2001, the university opted to let the Chair of Greek lapse. However, upon MacDowell's death the university received a bequest from his estate of over £2 million. The money was used to re-establish the chair, with the first incumbent of the MacDowell Chair in Greek appointed in 2012.

== List of Professors of Greek ==
- Alexander Dunlop (1704–1746)
- James Moor (1746–1774)
- John Young (1774–1821)
- Daniel Keyte Sandford (1821–1838)
- Edmund Law Lushington (1838–1875)
- Richard Claverhouse Jebb (1875–1889)
- Gilbert Murray (1889–1899)
- John Swinnerton Phillimore (1899–1906)
- Gilbert Austin Davies (1906–1934)
- William Rennie (1934–1946)
- Arnold Wycombe Gomme (1946–1957)
- Donald James Allan (1957–1971)
- Douglas MacDowell (1971–2001)
- Chair vacant (2001–2012)
- Jan Stenger (2012–2019)
- Chair vacant (2020–2023)
- Andrew Morrison (2023–present)

== See also ==
- Professor of Humanity (Glasgow)
- Professor of Classics (Edinburgh)
- Regius Professor of Humanity (Aberdeen)
- List of Professorships at the University of Glasgow
