= Mediaeval and Renaissance Studies =

Periodical of the Warburg Institute, 1941-68

Mediaeval and Renaissance Studies was a periodical of the Warburg Institute that was published between 1941 and 1968. It was conceived as a companion to the Journal of the Warburg and Courtauld Institutes, with each edition including a number of short specialist studies of an aspect of Medieval or Renaissance thought.

== Publication history ==
The first edition was edited by Richard Hunt of the University of Liverpool and Raymond Klibansky of Oriel College, Oxford. Production was hindered by war-time conditions. The first issue had been almost completely set in type at the St Catherine's Press in Bruges when the Germans invaded Belgium, meaning that printing had to be moved to England.

After it had been published for several years, Mediaeval and Renaissance Studies changed from a periodical to a serial. It ceased publication completely in 1968.

Indexes of contributors were published in the Journal of the Warburg and Courtauld Institutes.
