= William Ramsay (classical scholar) =

British 19th century classical scholar

William Ramsay (6 February 1806, Edinburgh – 12 February 1865, Sanremo) was a Scottish classical scholar.

== Life ==
Ramsay was born in Edinburgh on 6 February 1806, the third son of Agnata Frances, daughter of Vincent Biscoe of Hookwood, Surrey and Sir William Ramsay, seventh baronet of Bamff. He attended the Royal High School, Edinburgh. From 1823 to 1825 he studied Latin, Greek, and mathematics at the University of Glasgow. He then studied at Trinity College, Cambridge, where he graduated with a BA in 1831.

He returned to the University of Glasgow where he was elected Professor of Humanity. One of his students was Tiyo Soga

In 1834, he married Catherine Davidson, and together they had a daughter, Catherine Lilias Harriet.

Between 1833 and 1859, he published many works .

Due to failing health, Ramsay resigned his professorship in May 1863. He spent the following winter in Rome, collating the most important manuscripts of Plautus.

He died at Sanremo on 12 February 1865.

== Publications ==
His principal publications are:

- Hutton's "Course of Mathematics", remodelled by W. R. 1833, 8vo. 2.
- An Elementary Treatise on Latin Prosody, Glasgow, 1837, 12mo; revised 1859, 8vo. 3.
- Elegiac Extracts from Tibullus and Ovid, with notes, 1840, 12mo, and other editions.
- Cicero Pro Cluentio, edited with prolegomena, 1858, 8vo. 5.
- An Elementary Manual of Roman Antiquities, with illustrations, London and Glasgow, 1859, 8vo, and other editions.
- The Mostellaria of Plautus, with notes, 1869, 8vo (posthumous).

Ramsay also wrote a Manual of Roman Antiquities in the third division of the Encyclopædia Metropolitana (1848, etc.), and contributed to William Smith's dictionaries of Classical ‘Antiquities,’ ‘Geography,’ and ‘Biography,’ including the article on Cicero.
