= Black stane =

Black Stane or stone examinations are peculiar to the ancient universities of Scotland, in particular the University of St Andrews and University of Glasgow.

The black stanes date to the foundation of each university and were used for viva examinations with a set time, later recorded using a time glass to denote for how long the student would be expected to talk about the breadth and depth of his subject, normally in Latin.

The University of Glasgow black Stane exams lasted 20 minutes, the bedullus bearing the university mace turned the time glass and the exam began. When all of the sand ran out the bedullus shouted "fluxit" which is Latin for the sand "has flowed through". If the examiners were pleased the student passed the exam but if not, the timer was turned over and the student had to repeat the exam. Black stane exams lasted in Glasgow from the foundation in 1451 to the middle of the nineteenth century, though it is used for some exams.

The Glasgow black stane was enclosed in a wooden chair in 1775, with brass inlaid plates showing the arms of the university and the names of the founders, Pope Nicholas V, King James II of Scotland and Bishop Turnbull of Glasgow on the front of the chair. On the back are carved the Royal Arms of Scotland and the Royal Arms of England.

The St Andrews black stane was used from its foundation in 1410 and like Glasgow, until the middle of the nineteenth century. It was located in Old Parliament house, St Mary's college, from the late sixteenth century until the University Museum was founded in 2008. Students would be examined standing on the St Andrews black stane and the exam would last up to 60 minutes, according to the degree to be awarded.
