= George Muirhead (linguist) =

Scottish linguist

George Muirhead (1715–1773) was a Scottish linguist.

== Life ==
Muirhead was born at Dunipace. A graduate of the University of Edinburgh (M.A. 1742), he was ordained as a Minister of the Kirk in 1746. He was professor of oriental languages at the University of Glasgow (1753-4), until his appointment as Chair of Humanity in 1754. Muirhead was elected Clerk of Senate in 1769.

Muirhead died on 31 August 1773. He was "an enthusiastic and accomplished classical scholar", and with James Moor, professor of Greek, superintended the noble edition of Homer in 4 vols., printed by Robert and Andrew Foulis of Glasgow (the Iliad in 1756, the Odyssey, with the Hymns and Fragments, in 1758).

== Legacy ==
The Muirhead Prizes are awarded in his memory.
