= Ludwig von Urlichs =

German archeologist (1813-1889)

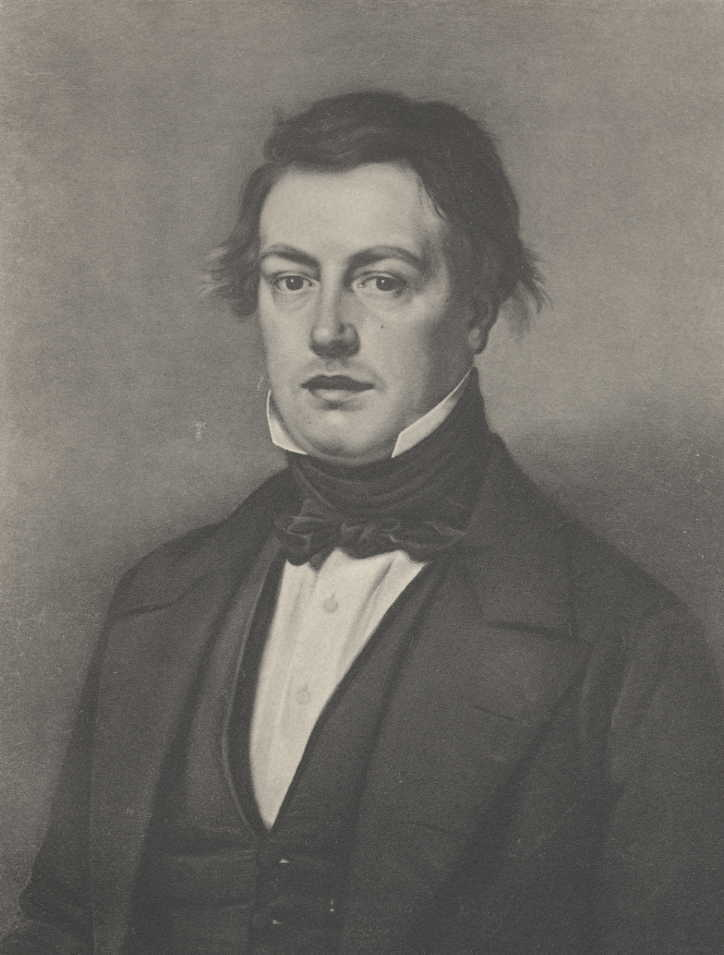
Karl Ludwig von Urlichs.

Karl Ludwig von Urlichs (November 9, 1813 – November 3, 1889) was a German philologist and archaeologist born in Osnabrück. He was the father of archaeologist Heinrich Ludwig Urlichs (1864-1935).

He received his education at the University of Bonn, where he was a student of Friedrich Gottlieb Welcker (1784-1868). Afterwards he travelled throughout Sicily and Italy; in Rome he collaborated with other German scholars on the multi-volume Beschreibung der Stadt Rom (1829–1842). In 1840 he returned to Bonn, where in 1841 he was co-founder and first chronicler of the Vereins von Altertumsfreunden im Rheinlande. In 1844 he became an associate professor at the University of Bonn.

In 1847 he was appointed professor of classical philology at the University of Greifswald, subsequently becoming a member of the Preußischen Abgeordnetenhauses (Prussian House of Representatives) and of the Erfurt Union. In 1855 he relocated to the University of Würzburg as chair of classical philology and aesthetics. He specialized in classical pottery and ancient sculpture, and at Würzburg was in charge of the large collection of art and antiques at the Martin von Wagner Museum.

He died in Würzburg.

Among his numerous publications was an important work on the landmarks of ancient Rome titled Codex Urbis Romae topographicus (1871), and an 1863 monograph on the life and works of the Greek sculptor Skopas called Skopas: Leben und Werke.

== Selected publications ==
- Achaei Eretriensis quae supersunt, dissertation Bonn 1834
- Disputatio critica de numeris et nominibus propriis in Plinii Naturali historia, Würzburg 1857
- Skopas: Leben und Werke, Greifswald 1863
- Mitarbeit bei dem Lexikon: Dictionary of Greek and Roman biography and mythology, Boston 1867
- Codex Urbis Romae topographicus, 1871
- Die Anfänge der griechischen Kuenstlergeschichte, Würzburg 1871
- Pergamon: Geschichte und Kunst, Leipzig 1883
