= Professor of Humanity (Glasgow) =

University of Glasgow Professorship

The Professor of Humanity is a professorship in Latin at the University of Glasgow in Scotland. Under the Nova Erectio of James VI the teaching of Latin was in the responsibility of the Regents. The title of Professor of Humanity was, on occasion, attached to one of the Regents' number from 1618.

A separate chair was created in 1682. After lapsing, it was revived in 1706.

No professor has been appointed since the retirement of Roger Green in 2008.

== Humanity Professors ==
- James Young (1682–1687)
- Chair vacant (1687–1706)
- Andrew Ross (1706–1735)
- George Ross (1735–1754)
- George Muirhead (1754–1773)
- William Richardson (1773–1814)
- Josiah Walker (1815–1831)
- William Ramsay (1831–1863)
- George Gilbert Ramsay (1863–1906)
- John Swinnerton Phillimore (1906–1927)
- William Rennie (1927–1934)
- Christian James Fordyce (1934–1971)
- Patrick Gerard Walsh (1971–1991)
- Roger Philip Hywell Green (1995–2008)
- Chair vacant (since 2008)

== See also ==
- MacDowell Professor of Greek
- Professor of Classics (Edinburgh)
- Regius Professor of Humanity (Aberdeen)
- List of Professorships at the University of Glasgow

== Sources ==
- Moss, Michael; Rankin, Moira; Richmond, Lesley (2001). Who, What and Where: The History and Constitution of the University of Glasgow (PDF). University of Glasgow.
