= James Finlayson (minister) =

Minister in Church of Scotland

James Finlayson, FRSE (15 February 1758 – 28 January 1808), was a minister in the Church of Scotland who served as Moderator of the General Assembly of the Church of Scotland 1802/3.

== Life ==
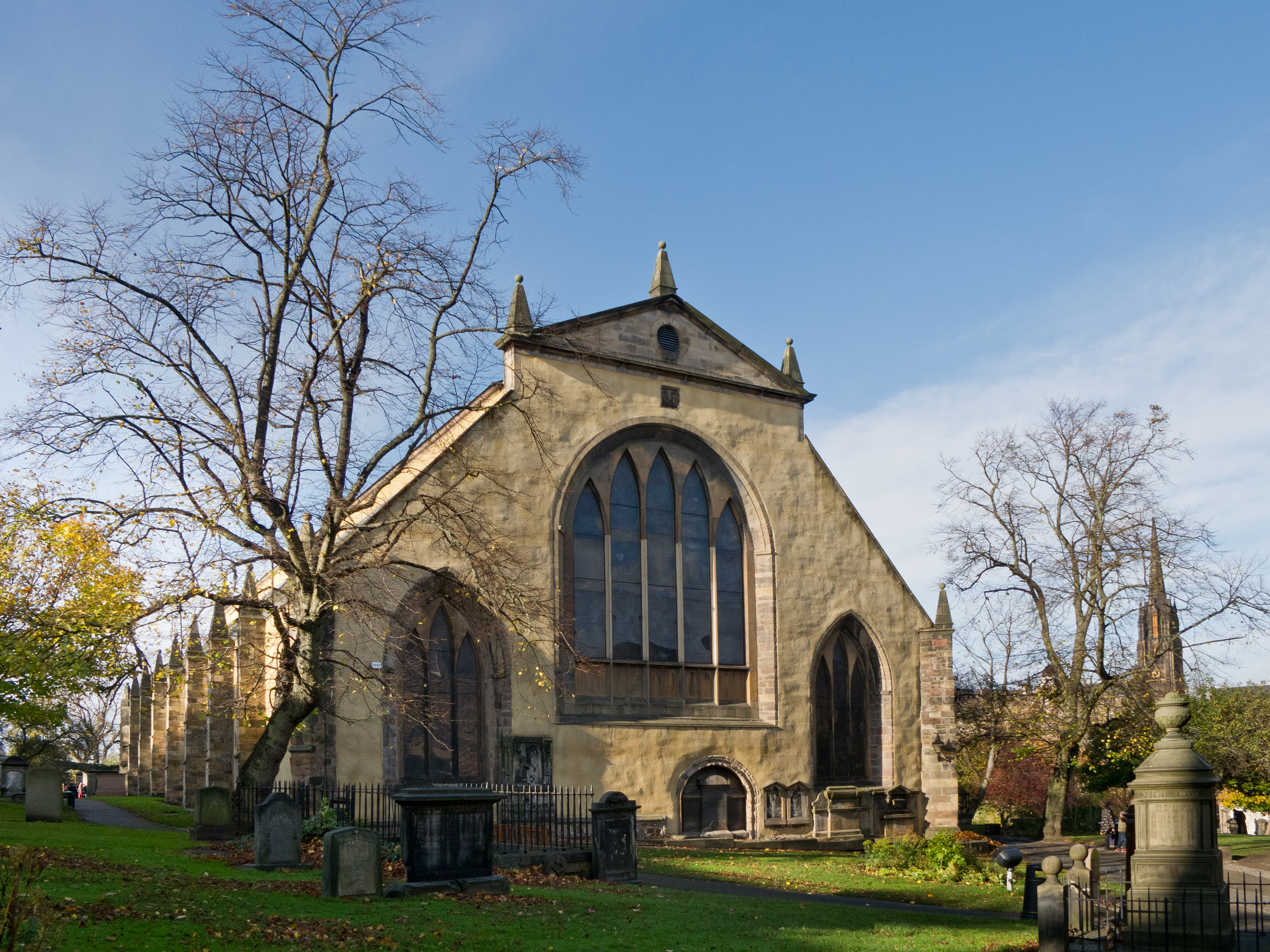
Greyfriars Kirk

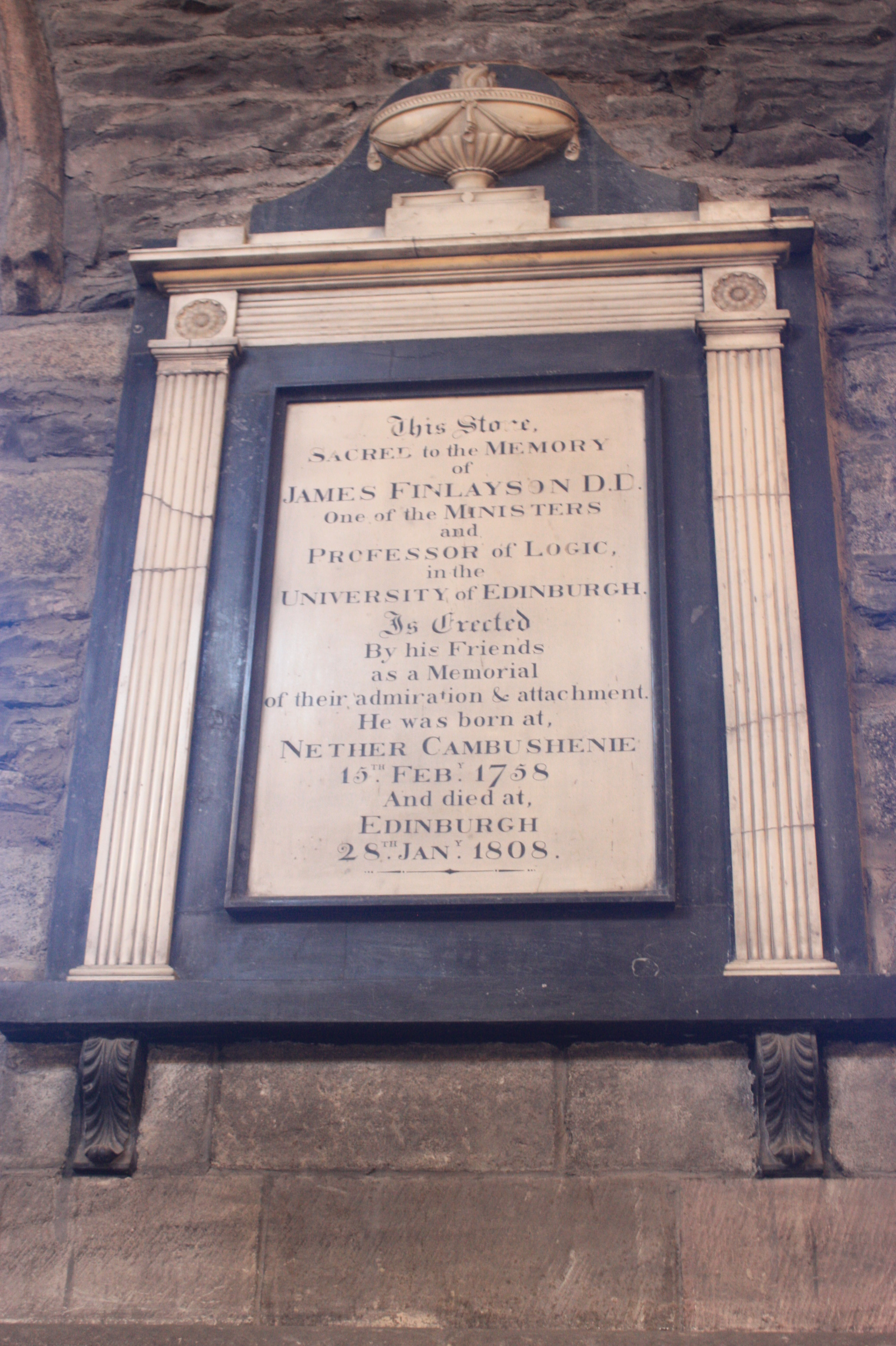
The grave of Rev James Finlayson, Dunblane Cathedral

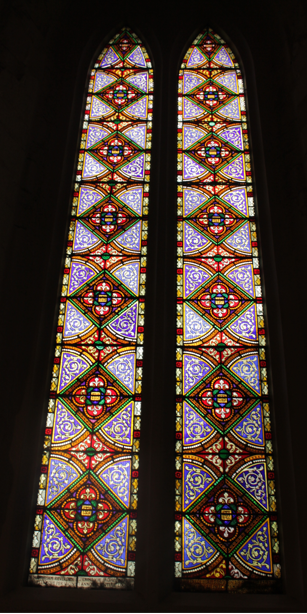
Memorial window to James Finlayson, Greyfriars Kirk

Finlayson was born the eldest son of William Finlayson on 15 February 1758, at Nether Cambushinnie Farm, near Kinbuck in the parish of Dunblane, Perthshire, where his ancestors had been settled for several centuries. He made rapid progress at school (first Kinbuck then Dunblane), and began his religious studies in the University of Glasgow at the age of 14. He held two tutorships, and subsequently became amanuensis to Professor Anderson, who had discovered his abilities. In 1782, he became domestic tutor to two sons of Sir William Murray of Ochtertyre. As the family spent the winter in Edinburgh, Finlayson continued his studies at the university. He was licensed to preach in 1785. In this year, the Duke of Atholl offered Finlayson a position as minister of Dunkeld, which he declined, as Sir William Murray had informed him that an arrangement had been proposed to procure for him the chair of logic in the University of Edinburgh. He was then offered a position as minister of Borthwick, near Edinburgh, of which parish he was ordained minister on 6 April 1787. He had assumed the duties of the logic professor in the winter session of 1786-7.

In 1787 he was elected a Fellow of the newly formed Royal Society of Edinburgh. His proposers were John Hill and John Walker.

Finlayson was now rising into reputation with a rapidity the more remarkable from his modest disposition. The most experienced sages of the church respected his judgment in questions of ecclesiastical policy. He therefore dedicated much of his leisure to study the laws, constitution, and history of the Scottish church, and began to take an active part in the details of its political government. This made him gradually lean more to the ecclesiastical than to the literary side of his functions. He soon became a leader on the moderate side in the church courts. In 1790, he was presented by the magistrates of Edinburgh to Lady Yester's Kirk.

In 1794 he was appointed to succeed Rev Robertson, the historian, as minister of Old Greyfriars. In 1799, on a vacancy occurring in the High Church of Edinburgh, he was chosen by the town council to fill that charge. The latter is considered the most honourable appointment in the Church of Scotland, and it was, at the time, rendered more desirable from the circumstance that he had for his colleague Hugh Blair, whose funeral sermon he was called upon to preach in little more than a year. The University of Edinburgh conferred on Finlayson the honorary doctorate of Doctor of Divinity (DD) on 28 March 1799. At this time he was living at 2 Park Street in Edinburgh.

In 1802 he was elected Moderator of the General Assembly of the Church of Scotland. He was elected king's almoner in the same year, but resigned the post almost immediately. These honours indicate the general estimate of Finlayson's merits. Finlayson established his ascendency on the wisdom of his councils and his knowledge of the laws and constitution of the church, and among his own party his sway was unlimited. Those who differed from him in church politics freely acknowledged his honourable character and the purity of his motives: his political opponents, in points of business unconnected with party, were occasionally guided by his judgment. His manner was simple and unpresuming; he was below the average height.

=== Later life and death ===
Finlayson wrote a biography of Dr. Hugh Blair, and a volume of his sermons was published after his death. In 1805, his constitution began to decline. In 1807, he was constrained to accept the assistance of one of his earliest friends, Principal George Husband Baird, who taught the class during the remainder of that session. On 25 January 1808, while conversing with Baird, he was seized with a paralytic affection. Among the few words he was able to articulate was the following sentence: "I am about to pass to a better habitation, where ail who believe in Jesus shall enter." On his deathbed, the senatus academicus of the university and the magistrates of Edinburgh waited on him and asked him to name the successor to his chair. In deference to his advice, an offer of the chair was made to Principal Baird, the gentleman he had named.

He died at 4 Park Street in Edinburgh on 28 January 1808, and was honoured with a public funeral in the Dunblane Cathedral.

His students and others erected a monument to his memory at Dunblane, and a memorial window of stained glass was also placed in Greyfriars Kirk in Edinburgh by his old pupil Principal John Lee of the University of Edinburgh.

== Writing ==
Finlayson published:

- Heads of an Argument in support of the Overture respecting Chapels of Ease, 1798
- A Sermon on Preaching, Edinburgh, 1801
- Sermons, Edinburgh, 1809

== Recognition ==
A memorial window to Finlayson was erected in Greyfriars Kirk in the late 19th century.
