= List of University of Edinburgh people =

This is a list of notable graduates as well as non-graduate former students, academic staff, and university officials of the University of Edinburgh in Scotland. It also includes those who may be considered alumni by extension, having studied at institutions that later merged with the University of Edinburgh. The university is associated with 20 Nobel Prize laureates, three Turing Award winners, an Abel Prize laureate and Fields Medallist, four Pulitzer Prize winners, three Prime Ministers of the United Kingdom, and several Olympic gold medallists.

== Government and politics ==
=== Heads of state and government ===
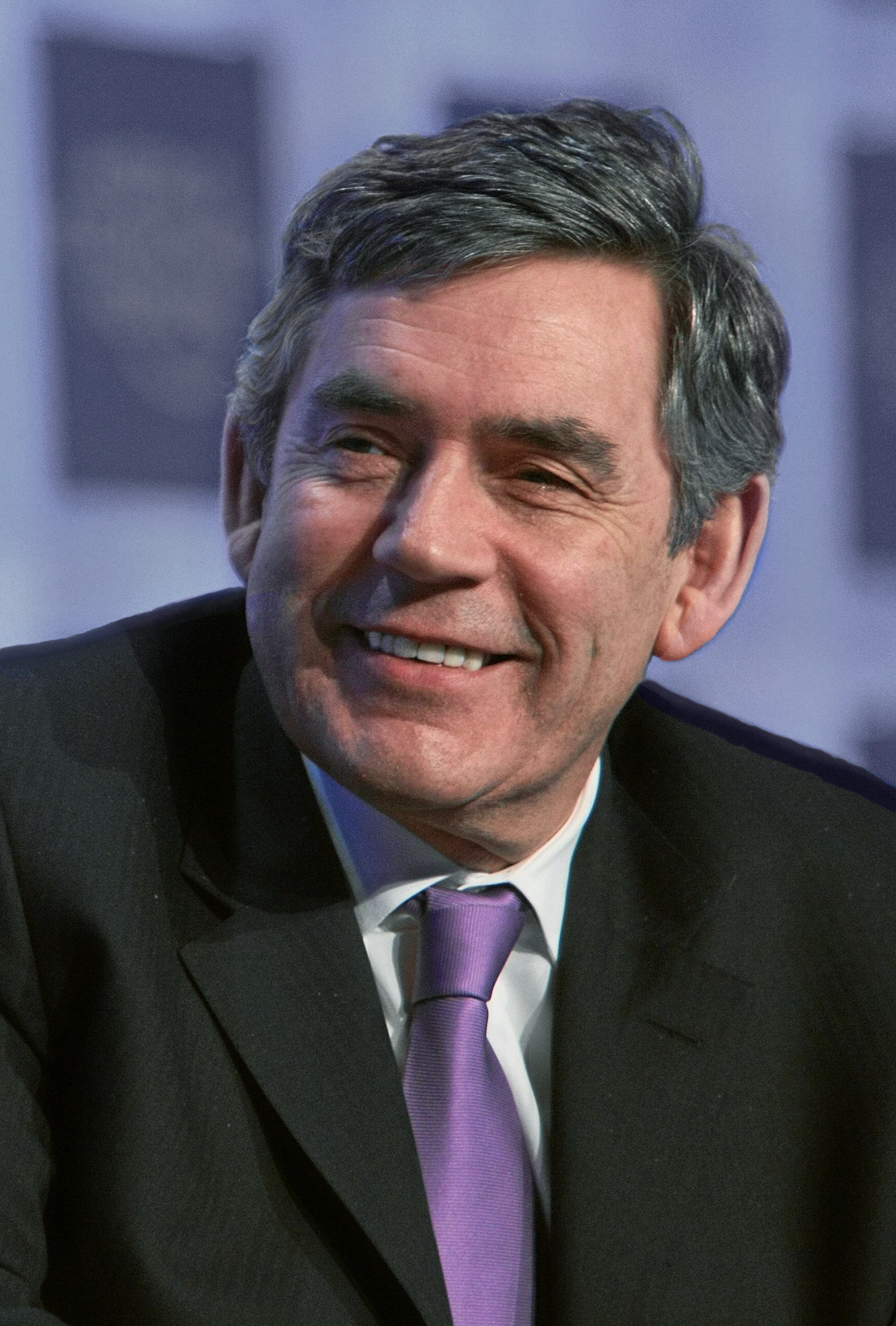
Gordon Brown, Prime Minister of the United Kingdom

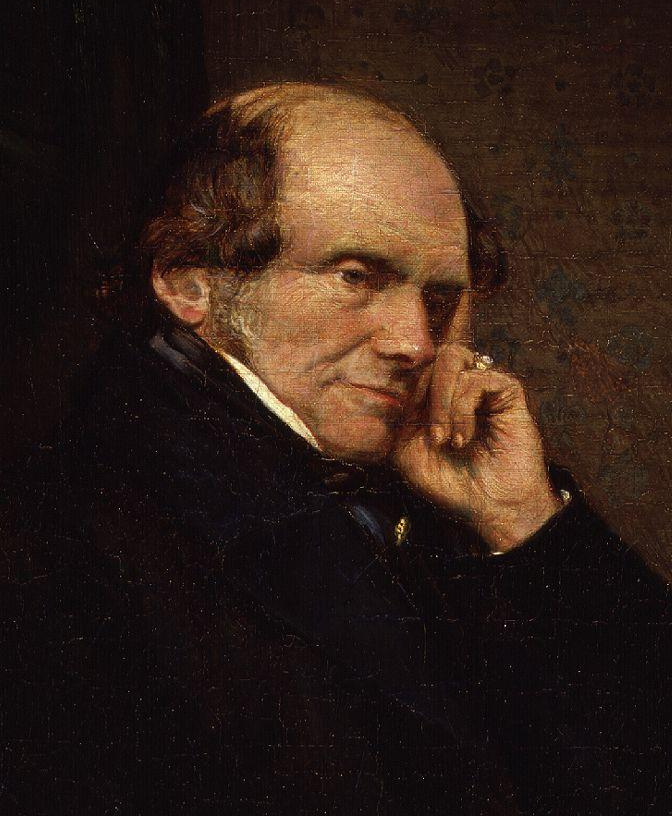
John Russell, 1st Earl Russell, Prime Minister of the United Kingdom

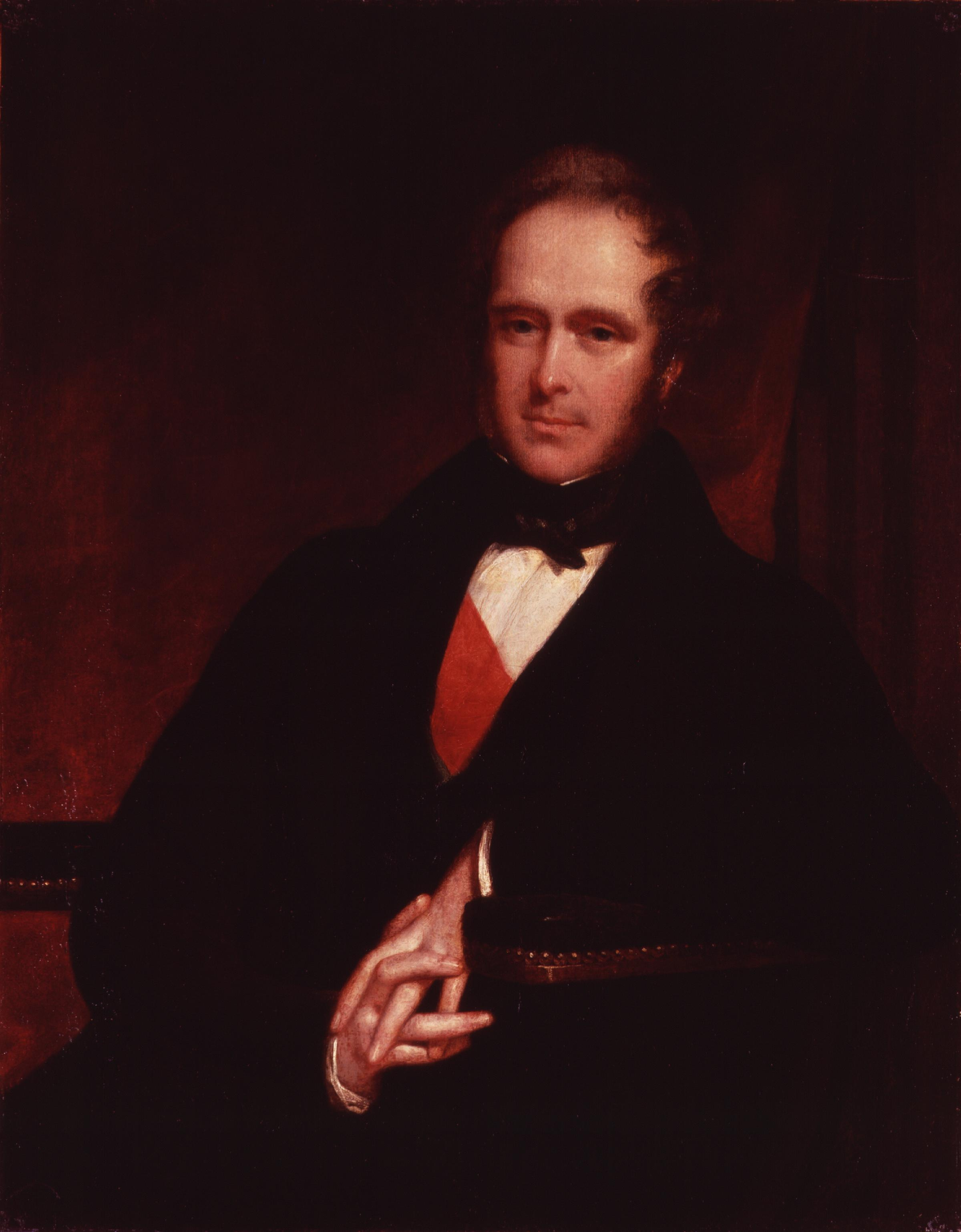
Henry Temple, 3rd Viscount Palmerston, Prime Minister of the United Kingdom

| Leader | State/government | Office |
|---|---|---|
| Dr Harini Amarasuriya | Sri Lanka | Prime Minister (2024–) |
| Hastings Banda | Malawi | Prime Minister (1964–1966), President (1966–1994) |
| Sir Robert Black | Colony of Singapore | Governor (1955–1957) |
| Sir Robert Black | British Hong Kong | Governor (1958–1964) |
| Sir Thomas Brisbane | New South Wales | Governor (1821–1825) |
| Gordon Brown | United Kingdom | Prime Minister (2007–2010) |
| Chang Taek-sang (張澤相) | South Korea | Prime Minister (1952) |
| John Crawfurd | (East India Company) Colonial Singapore | Resident (1823–1826) |
| Sir Gilbert Elliott | (Corsica) Anglo-Corsican Kingdom | Viceroy (1793–1796) |
| Sir Gilbert Elliott | (East India Company) British India | Governor-General (1807–1813) |
| Sir Dawda Jawara | (The Gambia) Gambia Colony and Protectorate | Prime Minister (1962–1965) |
| Sir Dawda Jawara | The Gambia | Prime Minister (1965–1970), President (1970–1994) |
| Yusuf Lule | Uganda | President (1979) |
| Fawzi Mulki | Jordan | Prime Minister (1953–1954) |
| Lord Dunrossil | Australia | Governor-General (1960–1961) |
| Daniel Chanis Pinzón | Panama | President (1949) |
| Julius Nyerere | Tanganyika | Chief Minister (1960–1961), Prime Minister (1961–1962), President (1962–1964) |
| Julius Nyerere | Tanzania | President (1964–1985) |
| Paul Reeves | New Zealand | Governor-General (1985–1990) |
| Lord John Russell | United Kingdom | Prime Minister (1846–1852; 1865–1866) |
| Sir Ninian Stephen | Australia | Governor-General (1982–1989) |
| John Swinney | Scotland | First Minister (2024-) |
| Lord Palmerston | United Kingdom | Prime Minister (1855–1858; 1859–1865) |
| Sir Charles Tupper | Canada | Prime Minister (1896) |
| William Walker | Nicaragua | Filibuster (1856–1857) |
| Yun Posun (尹潽善) | South Korea | President (1960–1962) |

=== United Kingdom ===
==== Cabinet and Party Leaders ====
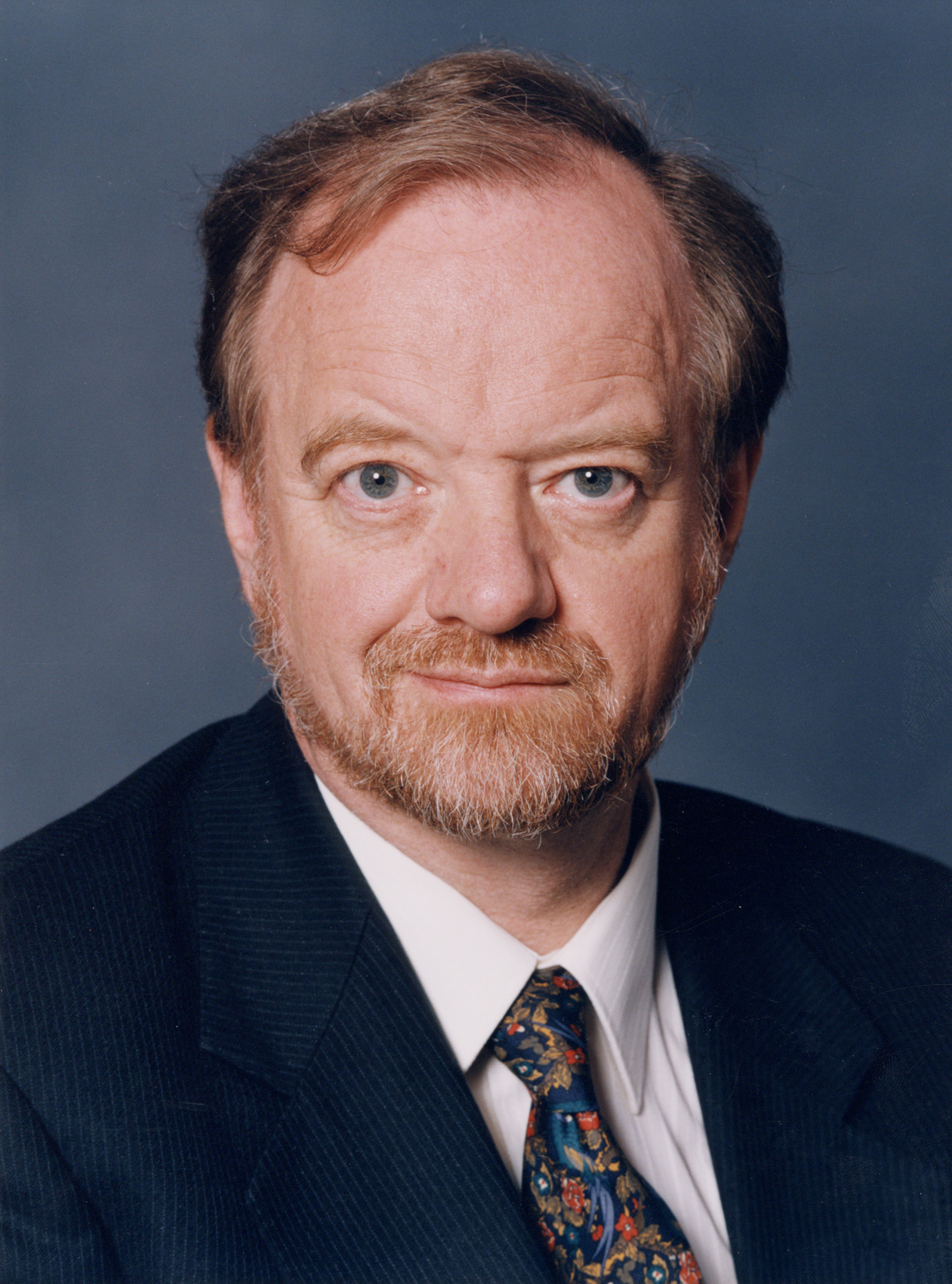
Robin Cook, Foreign Secretary

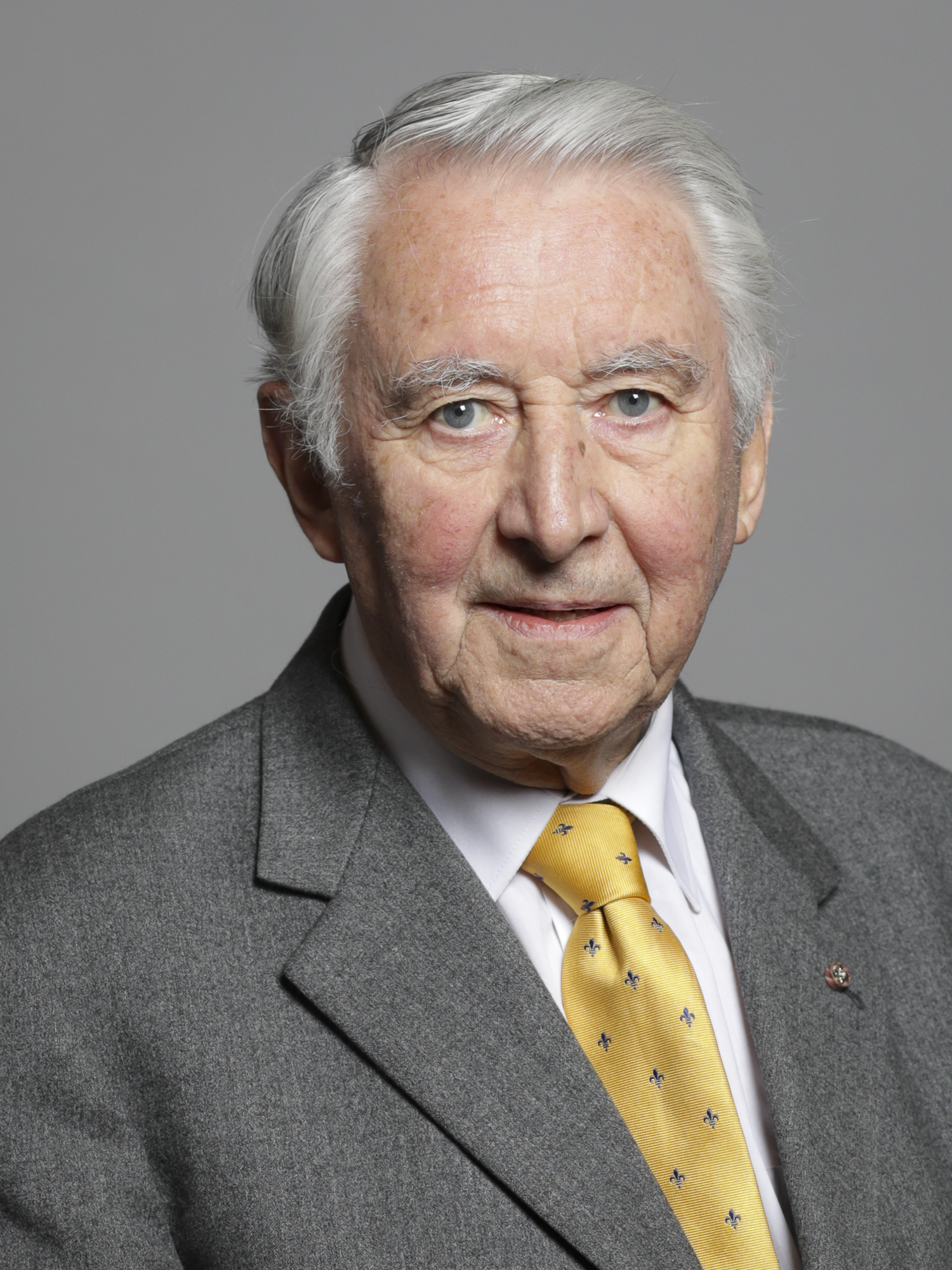
David Steel, Leader of the Liberal Democrats

- Douglas Alexander, Secretary of State for International Development (2007–2010), Secretary of State for Transport (2006–2007), and Secretary of State for Scotland (2006–2007; 2025–)
- Michael Ancram, 13th Marquess of Lothian, Chairman of the Conservative Party (1998–2001)
- John Anderson, 1st Viscount Waverley, Home Secretary (1939–1940), Lord President of the Council (1940–1943) and Chancellor of the Exchequer (1943–1945)
- Henry Brougham, 1st Baron Brougham and Vaux, Lord High Chancellor of Great Britain (1830–1834)
- David Campbell Bannerman, Chairman of the UK Independence Party (2005–2006), Deputy Leader (2006–2010)
- Robin Cook, Secretary of State for Foreign Affairs (1997–2001), Leader of the House of Commons (2001–2003) and President of the Party of European Socialists (2001–2004)
- Henry Dundas, 1st Viscount Melville, Home Secretary (1791–1794), Secretary of State for War (1794–1801) and First Lord of the Admiralty (1804–1805)
- Anneliese Dodds, Chair of the Labour Party (2021–)
- George Douglas-Hamilton, 10th Earl of Selkirk, First Lord of the Admiralty (1957–1959), Chancellor of the Duchy of Lancaster (1955–1957)
- Robert Dundas, 2nd Viscount Melville, First Lord of the Admiralty (1812–1830)
- Gilbert Elliot-Murray-Kynynmound, 2nd Earl of Minto, First Lord of the Admiralty (1835–1841)
- Robert Finlay, 1st Viscount Finlay, Lord High Chancellor of Great Britain (1916–1919)
- Sir John Gilmour, 2nd Baronet, Home Secretary (1932–1935)
- Auckland Geddes, 1st Baron Geddes, President of the Board of Trade (1919–1920)
- William Graham, President of the Board of Trade (1929–1931)
- Richard Haldane, 1st Viscount Haldane, Lord High Chancellor of Great Britain (1912–1915; 1924), Secretary of State for War (1905–1912)
- Thomas Hamilton, 9th Earl of Haddington, First Lord of the Admiralty (1841–1846)
- Tessa Jowell, Secretary of State for Culture, Media and Sport (2001–2007), Minister for the Olympics
- Patrick McLoughlin, Secretary of State for Transport (2012–2016), Chancellor of the Duchy of Lancaster (2016–2018)
- David Mundell, Secretary of State for Scotland (2015–2019)
- Ian Murray, Secretary of State for Scotland (2024–2025)
- Pat McFadden, Chancellor of the Duchy of Lancaster (2024–2025), Secretary of State for Work and Pensions (2025–)
- James Mackay, Baron Mackay of Clashfern, Lord High Chancellor of Great Britain (1987–1997)
- Robert Munro, 1st Baron Alness, Secretary of State for Scotland (1916–1922)
- William Mackenzie, 1st Baron Amulree, Secretary of State for Air (1930–1931)
- Ian Macpherson, 1st Baron Strathcarron, Chief Secretary for Ireland (1919–1920), Secretary of State for Work and Pensions (1920–1922)
- Michael Moore, Secretary of State for Scotland (2010–2013)
- Sir George Murray, Secretary of State for War and the Colonies (1828–1830)
- Sir William Molesworth, 8th Baronet, Secretary of State for the Colonies (1855)
- Henry Petty-Fitzmaurice, 3rd Marquess of Lansdowne, Chancellor of the Exchequer (1806–1807), Home Secretary (1827–1828), Lord President of the Council (1830–1834; 1835–1841; 1846–1852) and Leader of the House of Lords (1846–1852)
- Amber Rudd, Home Secretary (2016–2018), Secretary of State for Work and Pensions (2018–2019)
- Sir Malcolm Rifkind, Secretary of State for Foreign Affairs (1995–1997), Secretary of State for Defence (1992–1995)
- David Steel, Leader of the Liberal Party (1970–1976), Leader of the Liberal Democrats (1988)
- John Wheatley, Secretary of State for Health (1924)
- Alexander Wedderburn, 1st Earl of Rosslyn, Lord High Chancellor of Great Britain (1793–1801)

==== Scottish Cabinet and Party Leaders ====
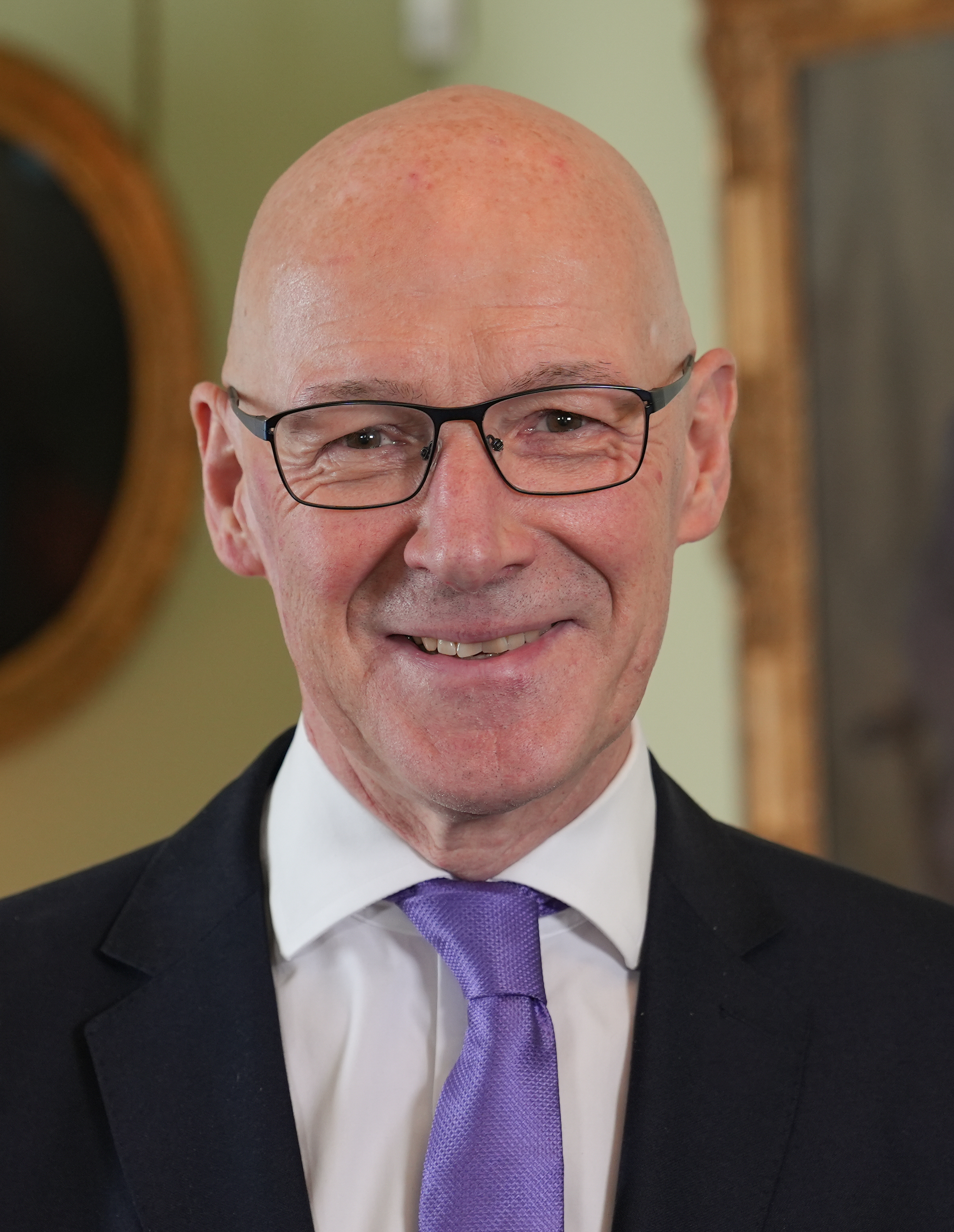
John Swinney, First Minister of Scotland

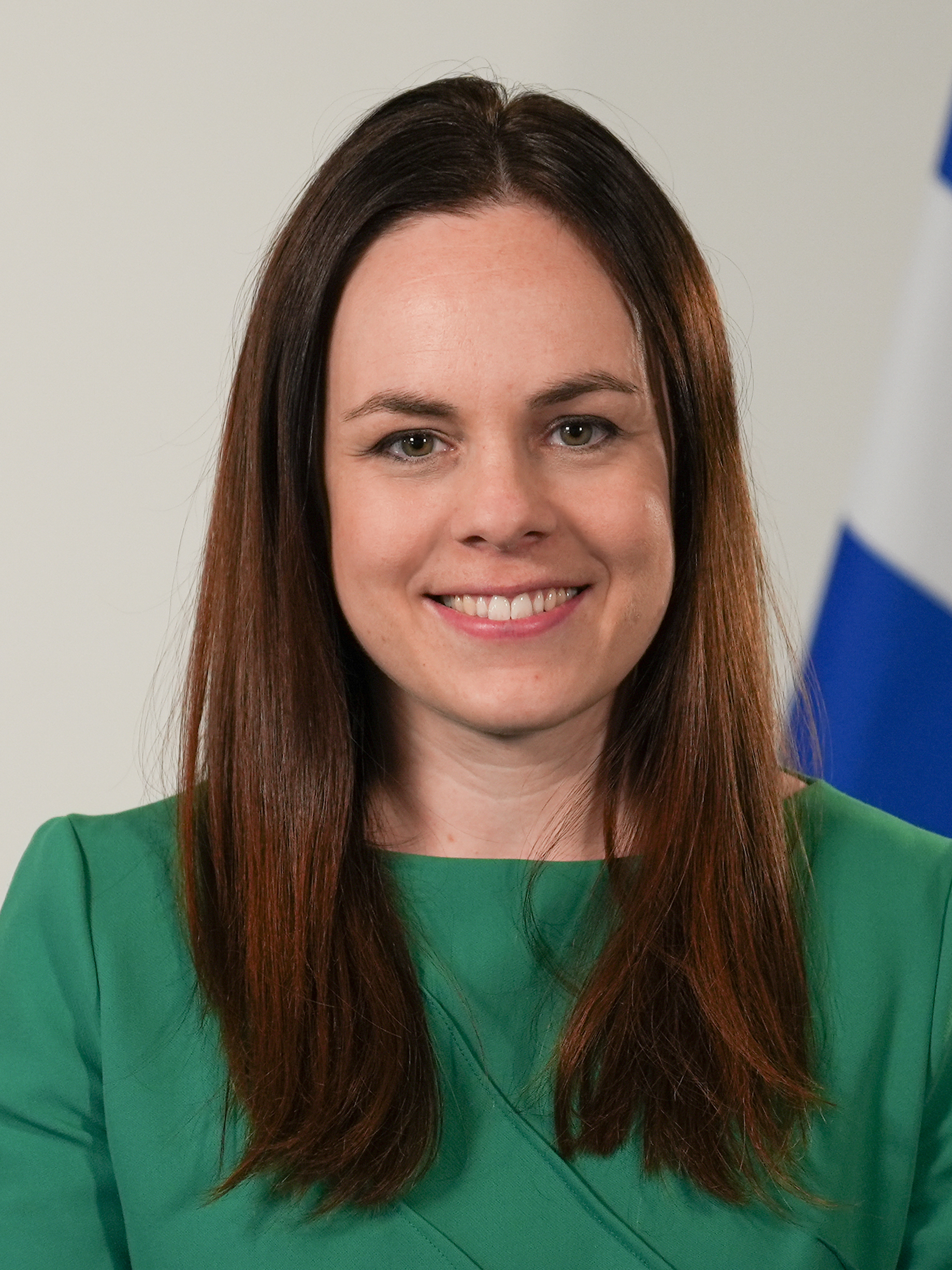
Kate Forbes, Deputy First Minister of Scotland

- Roseanna Cunningham, Cabinet Secretary for Environment, Climate Change and Land Reform (2009–2011; 2016–2021)
- Ruth Davidson, Leader of the Scottish Conservative Party (2011–2019)
- Kezia Dugdale, Leader of the Scottish Labour Party (2015–2017)
- Kate Forbes, Cabinet Secretary for Finance and the Economy (2020–2022), Deputy First Minister of Scotland (2024–)
- Iain Gray, Leader of the Scottish Labour Party (2008–2011; 2015)
- Andrew Dewar Gibb, Leader of the Scottish National Party (1936–1940)
- Robin Harper, co-convener of the Scottish Greens (2004–2008)
- Russell Johnston, Leader of the Scottish Liberal Party (1974–1988), Deputy Leader of the Liberal Democrats (1988–1992)
- Liam Kerr, Deputy Leader of the Scottish Conservative Party (2019–2020)
- Kenny MacAskill, Deputy Leader of the Alba Party (2021-2024), Leader of the Alba Party (2024-), Cabinet Secretary for Justice (2007–2014)
- Alexander MacEwen, first Leader of the Scottish National Party (1934–1936)
- David McLetchie, Leader of the Scottish Conservative Party (1999–2005)
- Robert McIntyre, Leader of the Scottish National Party (1947–1956)
- Michael Russell, Cabinet Secretary for the Constitution, Europe and External Affairs (2020–2021), President of the Scottish National Party (2020–)
- Alex Rowley, Leader of the Scottish Labour Party (2017)
- Leslie Spoor, founder of Scottish Green Party
- Nicol Stephen, Leader of Scottish Liberal Democrats (2005–2008), Deputy First Minister of Scotland (2005–2007)
- John Swinney, Cabinet Secretary for Finance, Constitution and Economy (2007–2014), Cabinet Secretary for Covid Recovery (2021–), Deputy First Minister of Scotland (2014–2022), First Minister (2024–)
- Jim Wallace, First Minister of Scotland (2000; 2001), Deputy First Minister of Scotland (1999–2005), Leader of the Scottish Liberal Democrats (1992–2005)
- Gordon Wilson, Leader of the Scottish National Party (1979–1990)

==== Current Members of the House of Commons ====
- Douglas Alexander, MP for Lothian East
- Catherine Atkinson, MP for Derby North
- Julia Buckley, MP for Shrewsbury
- Wendy Chamberlain, MP for North East Fife
- Charlie Dewhirst, MP for Bridlington and The Wolds
- Anneliese Dodds, MP for Oxford East
- John Grady, MP for Glasgow East
- Chris Hinchliff, MP for North East Hertfordshire
- Neil Hudson, MP for Epping Forest
- Danny Kruger, MP for East Wiltshire
- Josh MacAlister, MP for Whitehaven and Workington
- Jerome Mayhew, MP for Broadland
- Pat McFadden, MP for Wolverhampton South East
- Catherine McKinnell, MP for Newcastle upon Tyne North
- David Mundell, MP for Dumfriesshire, Clydesdale and Tweeddale
- Ian Murray, MP for Edinburgh South
- Louise Sandher-Jones, MP for North East Derbyshire
- Pete Wishart, MP for Perth and Kinross-shire
- Imogen Walker, MP for Hamilton and Clyde Valley

==== Current Members of the House of Lords ====
- James Bethell, 5th Baron Bethell, Conservative Peer
- Christine Blower, Baroness Blower, Labour Peer
- Kathryn Clark, Baroness Clark of Kilwinning, Labour Peer
- Lynda Clark, Baroness Clark of Calton, Labour Peer
- William Cullen, Baron Cullen of Whitekirk, Crossbench
- James Douglas-Hamilton, Baron Selkirk of Douglas, Conservative Peer
- Andrew Dunlop, Baron Dunlop, Conservative Peer
- Neil Davidson, Baron Davidson of Glen Clova, Labour Peer
- Ruth Davidson, Baroness Davidson of Lundin Links, Conservative Peer
- Murray Elder, Baron Elder, Labour Peer
- Peter Forster, Lord Spiritual
- George Foulkes, Baron Foulkes of Cumnock, Labour Peer
- Andrew Hardie, Baron Hardie, Crossbench
- David Hope, Baron Hope of Craighead, Crossbench
- Richard Keen, Baron Keen of Elie, Conservative peer
- Michael Andrew Foster Jude Kerr, 13th Marquess of Lothian, Conservative Peer
- Eleanor Laing, Baroness Laing of Elderslie, Conservative Peer
- James Lindesay-Bethune, 16th Earl of Lindsay, Conservative Peer
- Donald Mackay, Baron Mackay of Drumadoon, Conservative peer
- James Mackay, Baron Mackay of Clashfern, Conservative Peer
- Mark McInnes, Baron McInnes of Kilwinning, Conservative Peer
- Anne McIntosh, Baroness McIntosh of Pickering, Conservative Peer
- Patrick McLoughlin, Baron McLoughlin, Conservative Peer
- Malcolm Offord, Baron Offord of Garvel, Conservative peer
- Adrian Palmer, 4th Baron Palmer, Crossbench
- Robert Reed, Baron Reed of Allermuir, Crossbench
- Nicol Stephen, Baron Stephen, Liberal Democrat Peer
- Keith Stewart, Baron Stewart of Dirleton, Conservative Peer
- Alexander Trees, Baron Trees, Crossbench
- Fiona Twycross, Baroness Twycross, Labour Peer
- Jim Wallace, Baron Wallace of Tankerness, Liberal Democrat Peer
- John Woodcock, Baron Walney, Crossbench
- Clifton Wrottesley, 6th Baron Wrottesley, Conservative Peer

==== Current Members of the Scottish Parliament ====
- Claire Baker, MSP for Mid Scotland and Fife
- Jeremy Balfour, MSP for Lothian
- Maggie Chapman, MSP for North East Scotland
- Foysol Choudhury, MSP for Lothian
- Katy Clark, MSP for West Scotland
- Kate Forbes, MSP for Skye, Lochaber and Badenoch
- Christine Grahame, MSP for Midlothian South, Tweeddale and Lauderdale
- Liam Kerr, MSP for North East Scotland
- Fulton MacGregor, MSP for Coatbridge and Chryston
- Ben Macpherson, MSP for Edinburgh Northern and Leith
- Liam McArthur, MSP for Orkney
- Oliver Mundell, MSP for Dumfriesshire
- Alex Rowley, MSP for Mid Scotland and Fife
- Liz Smith, MSP for Mid Scotland and Fife
- Kaukab Stewart, MSP for Glasgow Kelvin
- John Swinney, MSP for Perthshire North
- Sue Webber, MSP for Lothian
- Martin Whitfield, MSP for South Scotland

=== United States ===
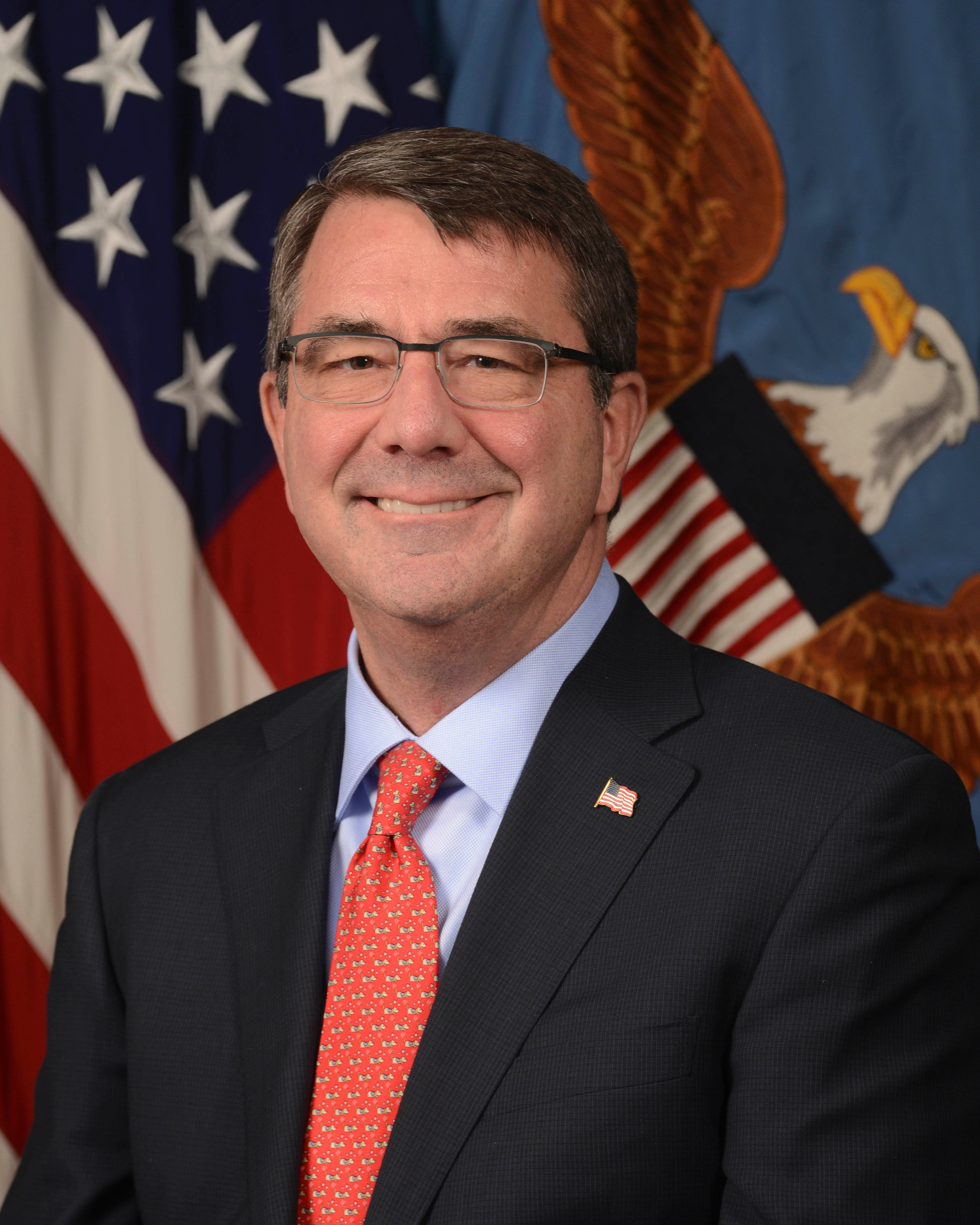
Ash Carter, United States Secretary of Defense

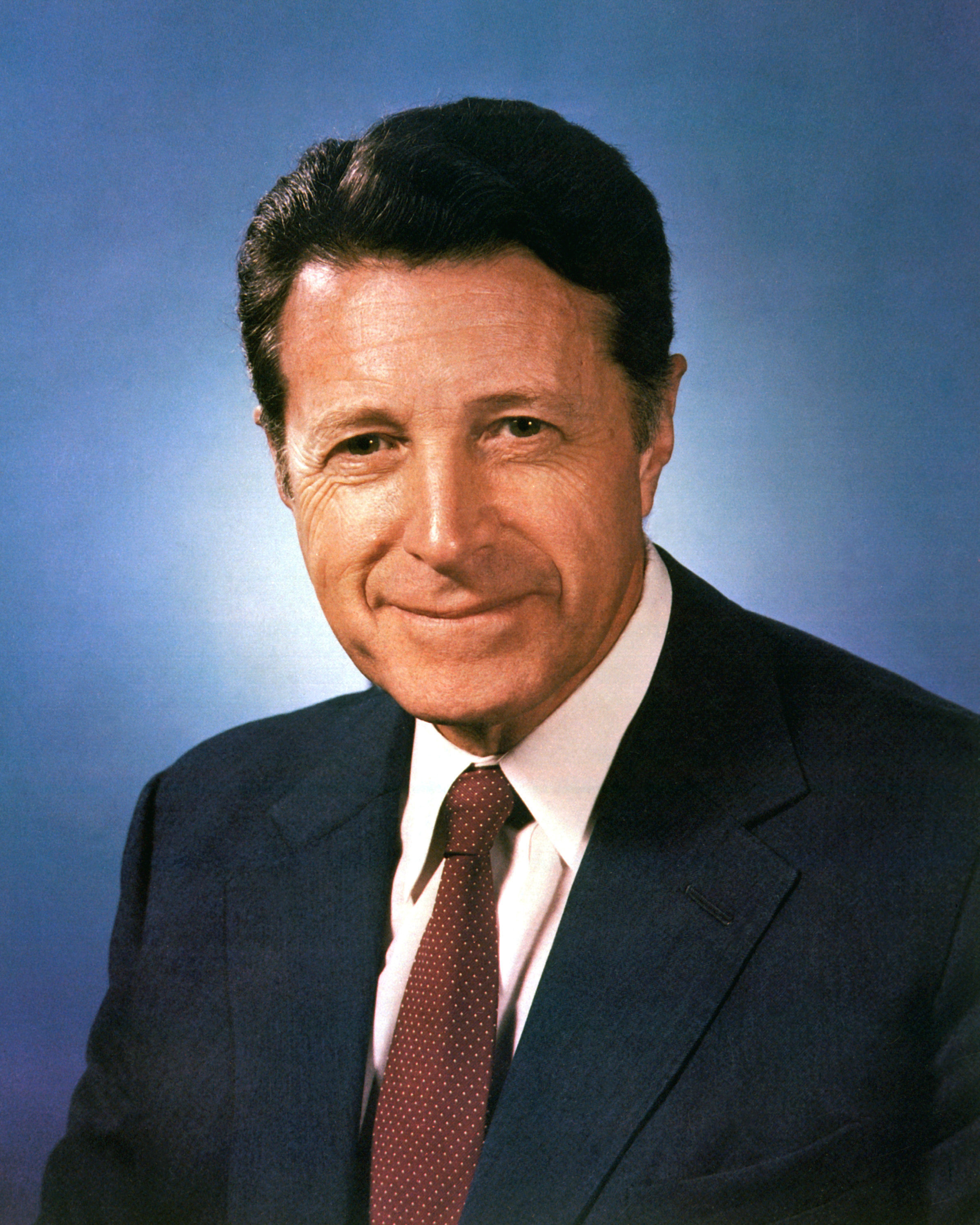
Caspar Weinberger, United States Secretary of Defense

- John Adams, 25th mayor of Richmond
- Robert Brooke, 10th governor of Virginia
- William Carmichael, Former U.S Ambassador to Spain
- Ashton Carter, 25th United States Secretary of Defense
- William Crawford, former U.S congressman from Pennsylvania
- Alexander J. Dallas, served as the 6th United States Secretary of the Treasury and briefly as both acting Secretary of War and acting Secretary of State under the fourth U.S. president, James Madison
- Beverly B. Douglas, former U.S congressman from Virginia
- James C. Duff, director of the Administrative Office of the U.S. Courts
- Enoh T. Ebong, director of U.S Trade and Development Agency (2022–)
- Robert J. Faucher, Assistant Secretary of State for Conflict and Stabilization Operations (2021-)
- Edwin Feulner, founder and president of conservative think tank The Heritage Foundation
- William Fleming, 3rd governor of Virginia
- William Foushee, 1st mayor of Richmond
- Cyrus Griffin, 8th President of the Continental Congress
- Aylett Hawes, former U.S congressman from Virginia
- James Jones, former U.S congressman from Virginia
- Walter Jones, former U.S congressman from Virginia
- John J. Kindred, former U.S congressman from New York
- Henry Latimer, former U.S senator from Delaware
- George Logan, former U.S senator from Pennsylvania
- James McClurg, 18th, 21st, and 24th Mayor of Richmond
- Dave McCurdy, former U.S congressman from Oklahoma, former chair of the House Intelligence Committee
- Samuel L. Mitchill, former U.S senator from New York
- Bill Moyers, 11th White House Press Secretary, White House Chief of Staff (1964–1965) and former director of Council on Foreign Relations
- Deborah K. Owen, former Commissioner of the Federal Trade Commission
- Joel Roberts Poinsett, 15th United States Secretary of War
- William C. Preston, former U.S senator from South Carolina
- Thomas Mann Randolph, Jr., 21st governor of Virginia
- Benjamin Rush, signatory, United States Declaration of Independence
- Jacob Gould Schurman, former U.S. Ambassador to China, Germany, Greece and Montenegro
- Adam Seybert, former U.S. congressman from Pennsylvania
- Ike Skelton, former U.S. congressman from Missouri, former chair of House Armed Services Committee
- William Spong Jr., former U.S senator from Virginia
- Arthur St. Clair, major-general in the Continental Army, 7th President of the Continental Congress, later 1st governor of the Northwest Territory
- Mike Synar, former U.S. congressman from Oklahoma
- Thomas Tudor Tucker, 3rd Treasurer of the United States, former U.S congressman from South Carolina
- Caspar Weinberger, 15th United States Secretary of Defense, 10th United States Secretary of Health, Education, and Welfare
- Alexander White, former U.S congressman from Virginia
- Hugh Williamson, signatory of the United States Constitution, Founding Father
- James Wilson, Associate Justice of the Supreme Court of the United States; signatory, United States Declaration of Independence
- John Witherspoon, signatory, United States Declaration of Independence

=== Africa ===
- Joseph Ukel Abango, South Sudan Minister of General Education (2011–2013)
- Eustace Akwei, Ghanaian Minister for Health (1966–1969)
- Prince Hamid Armah, Ghanaian MP
- Ahmed Mohamed Adan, Somali Foreign Minister (1990-1991)
- Herbert Bankole-Bright, political activist in Sierra Leone
- Jaya Krishna Cuttaree, Mauritian Minister of Labour, Lands and Housing (1982–2000), Minister of Industry and Trade (2000–2005)
- Moses Da Rocha, Nigerian doctor, journalist and politician
- Yusuf Dadoo, former chair of the South African Indian Congress and the South African Communist Party
- Unity Dow, Botswana Minister of Foreign Affairs and International Cooperation (2019–2020), member of the National Assembly
- Patrick Duncan, 6th governor-general of the Union of South Africa, South African Minister for the Interior, Education and Public Health (1921–1924)
- Kesaveloo Goonam, South African doctor, Indian nationalist and anti-apartheid activist
- Alex Ibru, Nigerian Minister of Internal Affairs (1993–1995)
- Omar Ali Juma, former vice-president of Tanzania
- Danielle de St. Jorre, Seychelles Minister of Foreign Affairs (1989–1997)
- Vedastus Kyalakishaija Kyaruzi, former Permanent Representative of Tanzania to the United Nations
- Nazir Karamagi, Tanzanian Minister of Energy and Minerals (2006–2008)
- Nelson P. W. Khonje, Speaker of the National Assembly of Malawi (1975–1987)
- Peter Msolla, Tanzanian MP
- Shettima Ali Monguno, Nigerian Federal Minister for Airforce and Internal Affairs (1965–1966), Minister for Mines, Power, Petroleum and Energy (1972–1975), President of OPEC (1972–1973)
- James Moroka, President of the African National Congress (1949–1952)
- Agnes Nyalonje, Malawi Minister of Education (2020–)
- Monty Naicker, anti-apartheid activist and leader of the South African Indian Congress
- Frederick Nanka-Bruce, Ghanaian doctor, journalist and former member of the Ghanaian Parliament
- Bandele Omoniyi, Nigerian law student and political activist
- Betty Ogwaro, South Sudanese Minister of Agriculture and Forestry (2011–2014; 2014–2015; 2016–2019)
- Sam Ongeri, Kenyan Minister for Education (2008–2012), Minister for Foreign Affairs (2012–2013)
- Imrana Alhaji Buba, Nigerian social entrepreneur and political activist
- Hae Phoofolo, interim prime minister of Lesotho
- Benjamin Quartey-Papafio, first Ghanaian doctor and member of the Gold Coast Legislative Council
- John K Randle, West African doctor and politician
- Richard Sezibera, Rwandan Minister of Foreign Affairs (2018–2019), 4th Secretary-General of the East African Community (2011–2016)
- Richard Akinwande Savage, Nigerian doctor, pan-African politician and newspaper editor
- Noah Wekesa, Kenyan Minister for Forestry and Wildlife (2008–2012), Minister for Education (2007), and Minister for Science (2005–2007)

=== Asia ===
- Harini Amarasuriya, Sri Lankan MP
- Chu Anping, Chinese journalist and political activist
- Mukhtar Ahmed Ansari, Indian nationalist, President of the Indian National Congress (1927–1928)
- Kōichirō Asakai, Japanese ambassador to the United States and ambassador to the Philippines who oversaw the signing of U.S.-Japan Security Treaty
- Lalith Athulathmudali, Sri Lankan Minister of Trade and Shipping (1977–1984)
- Fu Ssu-nien, linguist and historian, one of the leaders of the Chinese May Fourth Movement in 1919
- Hsu Hsin-liang, Chairman of Taiwan's Democratic Progressive Party (1992-1993 and 1996–1998) and Magistrate of Taoyuan (1977–1979)
- Sir Reginald Johnston, Puyi's tutor and advisor, last Commissioner of British Weihaiwei
- Prakash Karat, General Secretary of the Communist Party of India (Marxist) (2005–2015)
- M. C. M. Kaleel, Sri Lankan Minister of Home Affairs (1960)
- Arbab Alamgir Khan, Pakistan Federal Minister for Communications (2012–2013)
- Lim Chong Eu, 2nd Chief Minister of Penang (1969–1990) and founder of Parti Gerakan Rakyat Malaysia
- Zhang Shizhao, Chinese journalist, educator and Minister of Justice (1924–1925) and Minister of Education (1925)
- Wu Zhihui, Chinese linguist and major political figure during the Republic of China (1912–1949)
- Hsiao Chia-chi, former Deputy Secretary-General of the Executive Yuan, former Deputy Mayor of Taichung

=== Canada ===
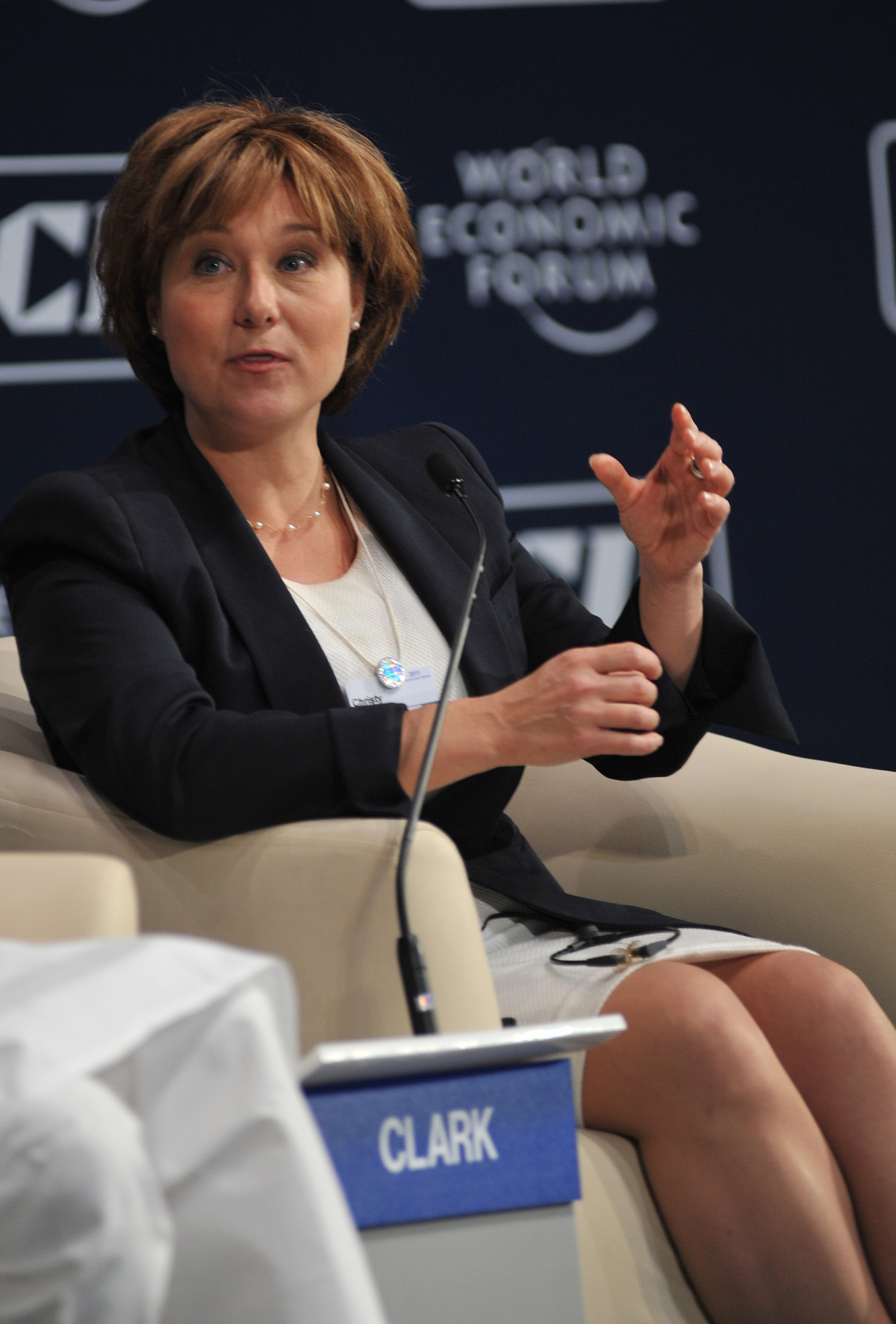
Christy Clark, Premier of British Columbia

- William Johnston Almon, former Canadian senator for Halifax
- Peter Boehm, Canadian senator for Ontario
- Edward Borron, former MP for Algoma
- Christy Clark, 35th Premier of British Columbia
- George Ralph Richardson Cockburn, former MP for Toronto Centre
- George Alexander Drummond, former Canadian senator for Quebec, 12th president of the Bank of Montreal
- Kirsty Duncan, MP for Etobicoke North, Deputy Leader of the Government in the House of Commons (2019-), Minister for Science (2015–2019)
- Adelbert Edward Hanna, former MP for Lanark South
- Robert James Manion, Canadian cabinet minister, Conservative Leader of the Opposition 1938–1940
- Joseph Morrin, 7th and 9th mayor of Quebec
- Sir William MacGregor, 60th governor of Newfoundland
- Frederick Montizambert, first Director General of Public Health in Canada
- Andrew Ross McMaster, former MP for Brome and Provincial Treasurer of Quebec
- Clarence Primrose, former Canadian senator for Nova Scotia
- James Palmer Rankin, former Canadian senator for Ontario
- Alexander David Stewart, former mayor of Hamilton, Ontario
- Alexander Warburton, 7th Premier of Prince Edward Island
- Arthur Trefusis Heneage Williams, former MP and Chief Government Whip

=== Caribbean ===
- John Alcindor, Trinidadian doctor and politician
- Charles Duncan O'Neal, Barbados politician
- Edgar F. Gordon, doctor and trade union leader in Bermuda
- David Pitt, Baron Pitt of Hampstead, Grenadian politician, first person of African descent to stand as an MP (in Britain), second person of African descent to sit in the House of Lords

=== Europe ===
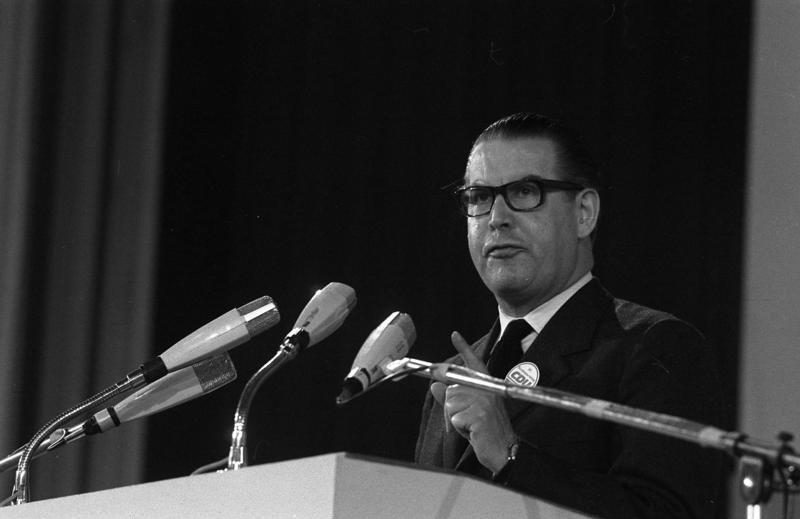
Gerhard Schröder (CDU), West German Foreign Minister and Defence Minister

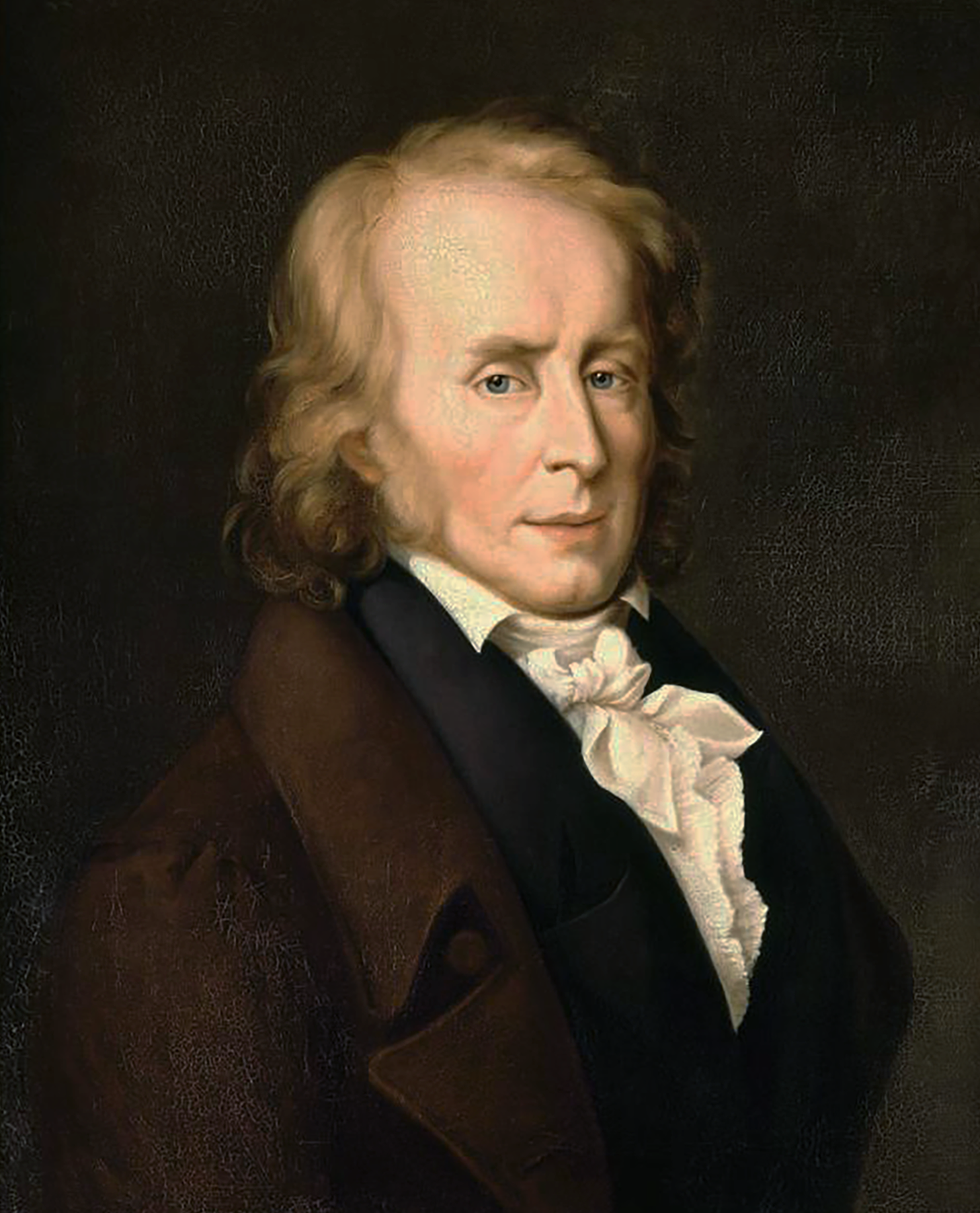
Benjamin Constant, Leader of the French Liberal Party after the Bourbon Restoration

- Mina Andreeva, Chief Spokesperson for the European Commission
- Gisela Babel, former member of the German Bundestag
- Elmar Brok, former MEP for Germany, Chair of the European Parliament Committee on Foreign Affairs (1999–2007; 2012–2017) and President of the Union of European Federalists (2013–2018)
- Rebecca Buttigieg, Maltese MP
- Benjamin Constant, French politician and eminent political theorist, Member of the Tribunat (1799–1802), Member of the Council of State (1815), Member of the Chamber of Députés (1819–1830)
- Muriel Casals i Couturier, member of the Parliament of Catalonia
- Katja Dörner, Mayoress of Bonn, Germany
- Tedi Dobi, Albanian Deputy Minister of Justice (2024–2026)
- Biljana Đorđević, member of the Serbian National Assembly
- Aina Calvo, former Mayoress of Palma, Spain
- Furio Honsell, former mayor of Udine, Italy
- Giorgos Gerapetritis, Greek Minister of State (2019–2023), Minister of Foreign Affairs (2023–)
- Jón Baldvin Hannibalsson, Icelandic Minister of Finance (1987–1988), Foreign Minister (1988–1995)
- Harri Jaskari, former member of the Parliament of Finland
- Jóhann Páll Jóhannsson, Icelandic Minister for the Environment and Natural Resources (2024-)
- Ögmundur Jónasson, Icelandic Minister of Health (2009) and Minister of the Interior (2011–2013)
- Hanna Birna Kristjánsdóttir, 19th Mayor of Reykjavík, Icelandic Minister of the Interior (2013–2014)
- Árni Mathiesen, Icelandic Minister of Finance (2005–2009)
- Radu Marian, Moldovian MP
- Angelika Niebler, MEP for Germany, Deputy Chairwoman of European People's Party (2015–)
- Theodoros Roussopoulos, Greek Minister of State (2004–2008), President of the Parliamentary Assembly of the Council of Europe (2024-)
- Gerhard Schröder (CDU), West German Federal Minister of the Interior (1953–1961), Federal Minister of Foreign Affairs (1961–1966), and Federal Minister of Defence (1966–1969), 1969 presidential candidate
- Gustaf Algernon Stierneld, Swedish Prime Minister for Foreign Affairs (1838–1840; 1848–1856)
- Péter Ungár, Member of the National Assembly of Hungary, Leader of LMP – Hungary's Green Party (2022-)
- Jerzy Żyżyński, economist and member of the Polish Sejm

=== Middle East ===
- Najah al-Attar, former vice president of Syria
- Lamis al-Alami, Palestinian Minister of Education (2007–2013)
- Mehmet Aydın, Turkish Minister of State (2002–)
- Hovhannes Bujicanian, Armenian teacher in the Ottoman Empire
- Saad bin Khalid Al Jabri, Saudi Arabian Minister of State
- Yahya bin Mahfoudh al-Mantheri, Omani Chairman of Council of State (2004–2020)
- Abu Bakr al-Qirbi, Yemeni Minister of Foreign Affairs (2001–2014; 2016)
- Bassam Talhouni, Jordanian Minister for Justice (2013–2016)
- Hikmat Abu Zayd, first female cabinet minister of Egypt

=== Oceania ===
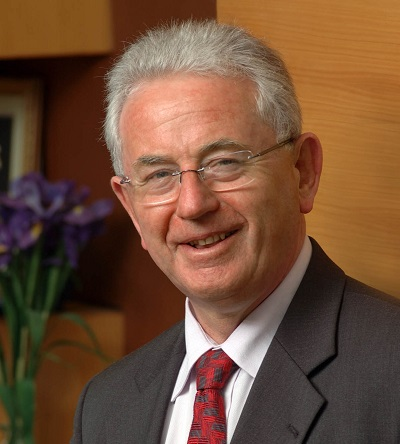
Sir Michael Cullen, Deputy Prime Minister of New Zealand

- Richard Arthur, New South Wales Minister for Public Health (1927–1930)
- Sir John Bowser, 26th Premier of Victoria
- Sir Thomas Brisbane, former governor of New South Wales whose name gave rise to the Australian city, Brisbane
- Francis Bugotu, Permanent Representative of the Solomon Islands to the United Nations (1978–1992), Secretary-General of the Pacific Community (1982–1986)
- Cyril Cameron, former Australian senator for Tasmania
- Sir John Logan Campbell, 17th Mayor of Auckland
- Sir Michael Cullen, former deputy prime minister of New Zealand
- John Dedman, Australian Minister for War Organisation (1941-1945), Minister for Defence (1946-1949)
- John Garland, New South Wales Minister for Justice (1909–1910; 1916–1919)
- Sir James Graham, 41st Mayor of Sydney
- Sir William MacGregor, 11th governor of Queensland
- Malcolm Mackay, Australian Minister for the Navy (1971–1972)
- John Alexander MacPherson, 7th Premier of Victoria
- Andrew McLachlan, Australian senator for South Australia, Deputy President of the Australian Senate (2022-)
- F. Russell Miller, 40th Mayor of Invercargill, New Zealand
- Sir David Monro, 2nd Speaker of the New Zealand House of Representatives
- Sir Hugh Nelson, 11th Premier of Queensland
- Carty Salmon, 2nd Speaker of the Australian House of Representatives
- David Seath, New Zealand Minister of Internal Affairs (1963–1972)
- Sir Alexander Stuart, 9th Premier of New South Wales
- Henry Thacker, 32nd Mayor of Christchurch, New Zealand

== Royalty ==
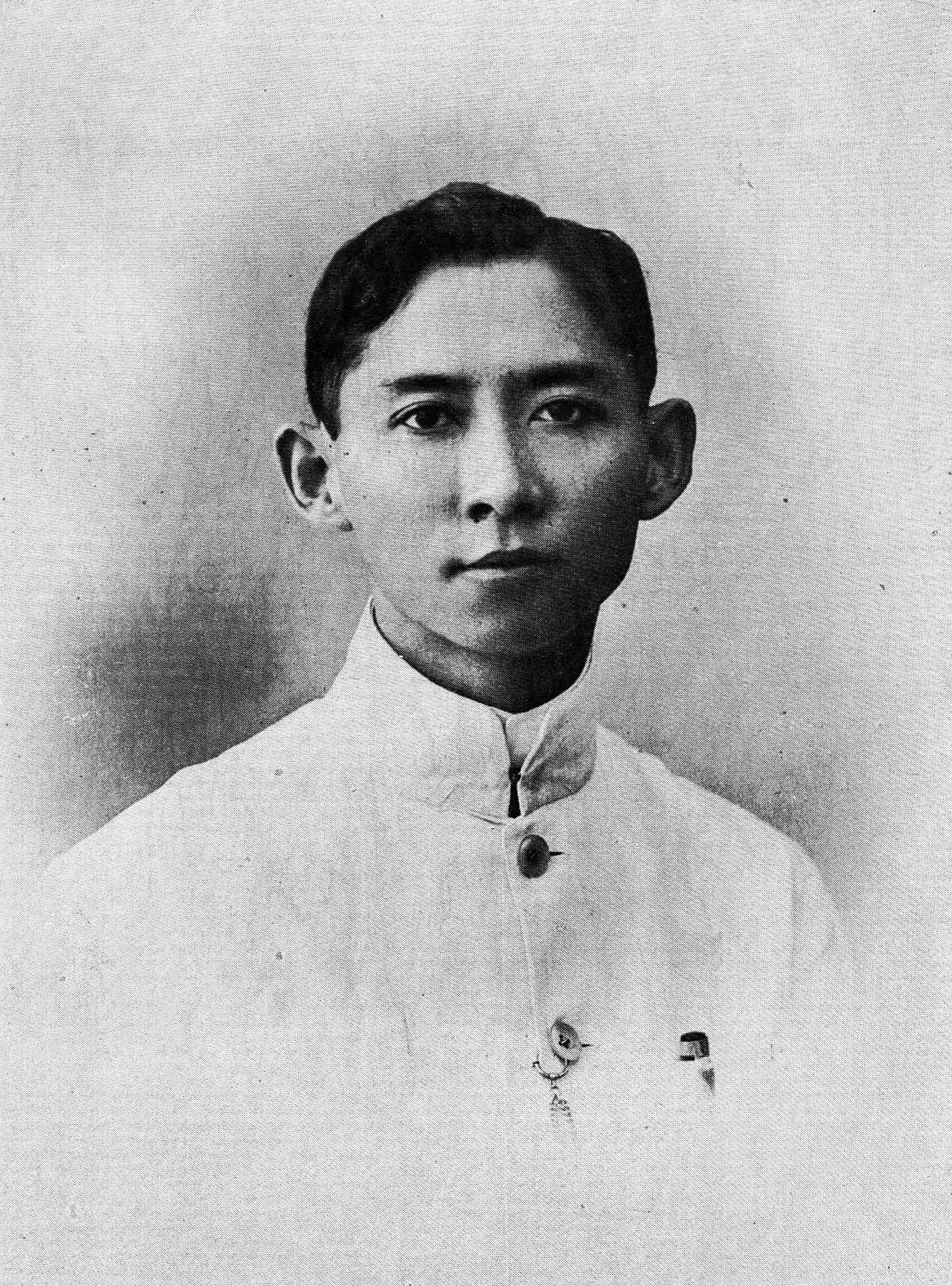
Mahidol Adulyadej, the Prince Father

- Mahidol Adulyadej, the Prince Father, founder of the House of Mahidol, father to Thai King Rama VIII and King Rama IX
- Albert, 12th Prince of Thurn and Taxis, head of the House of Thurn and Taxis
- Countess Alexandra Nikolaevna Tolstoy-Miloslavsky, member of the Tolstoy family
- Archibald Campbell, 3rd Duke of Argyll
- David Carnegie, 4th Duke of Fife
- Charles Carnegie, Earl of Southesk, heir apparent to the Dukedom of Fife
- Samuel Chatto and Arthur Chatto, sons of Elizabeth II's niece Lady Sarah Chatto
- Edward VII, King of the United Kingdom and Emperor of India (Note: Edward was taught by professor Lyon Playfair and others at Edinburgh during 1859. Although he attended courses, he never formally matriculated as a student.)
- George Percy, Earl Percy, heir apparent to the Dukedom of Northumberland
- Henry FitzRoy, 12th Duke of Grafton, direct male-line descendant of Charles II of England
- Lady Amelia Windsor, a relative of the British royal family
- Margareta of Romania, Custodian of the Crown of Romania
- Lady Marina Windsor, a relative of the British royal family
- Mako Komuro, former member of the Imperial House of Japan
- Princess Nora zu Oettingen–Spielberg, member of the House of Oettingen-Spielberg
- Princess Raiyah bint Hussein, member of the House of Hashim
- Princess Salha bint Asem, member of the House of Hashim
- Princess Tsuguko of Takamado, member of the Imperial House of Japan
- Prince Pavel Mikhailovich Dashkov, Russian aristocrat
- Louis Spencer, Viscount Althorp, heir apparent to the Spencer earldom and first cousin of the Duke of Cambridge and Prince Harry
- Bhagvat Singh, former maharaja of the princely state of Gondal

== Judges and lawyers ==
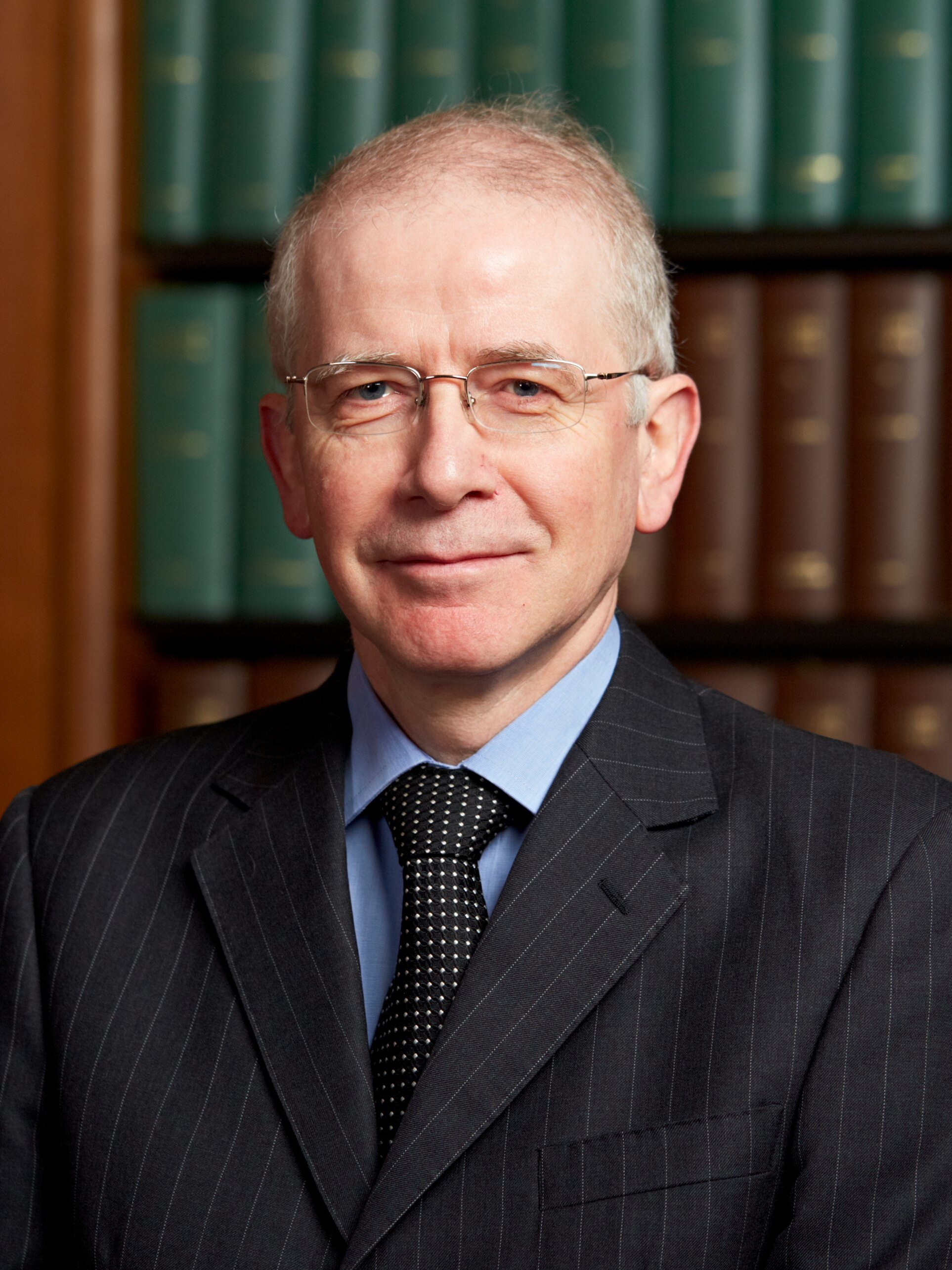
Lord Reed of Allermuir, President of the Supreme Court of the United Kingdom (2020–)

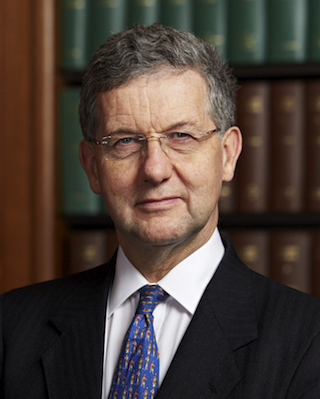
Lord Hodge, Deputy President of the Supreme Court of the United Kingdom (2020–)

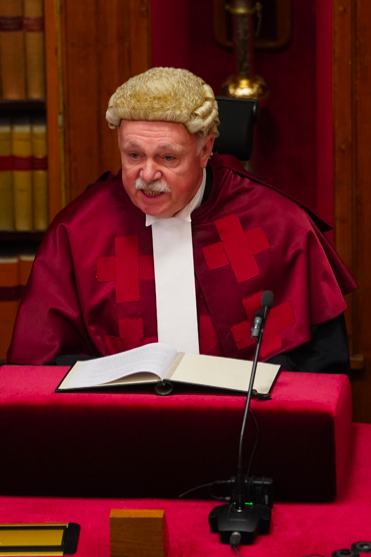
Lord Pentland, Lord President of the Court of Session and Lord Justice General (2025–)

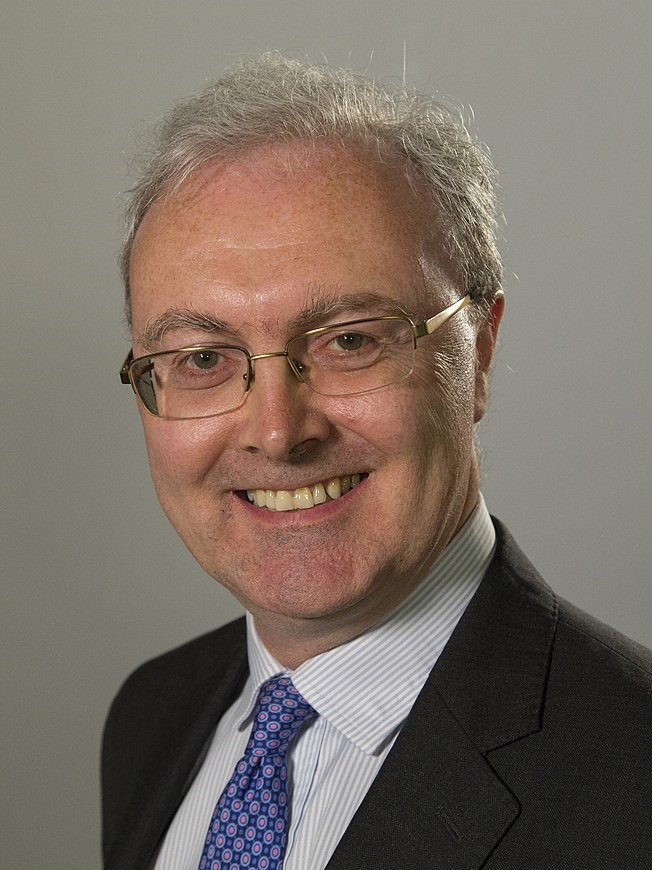
James Wolffe, Lord Advocate (2016–2021)

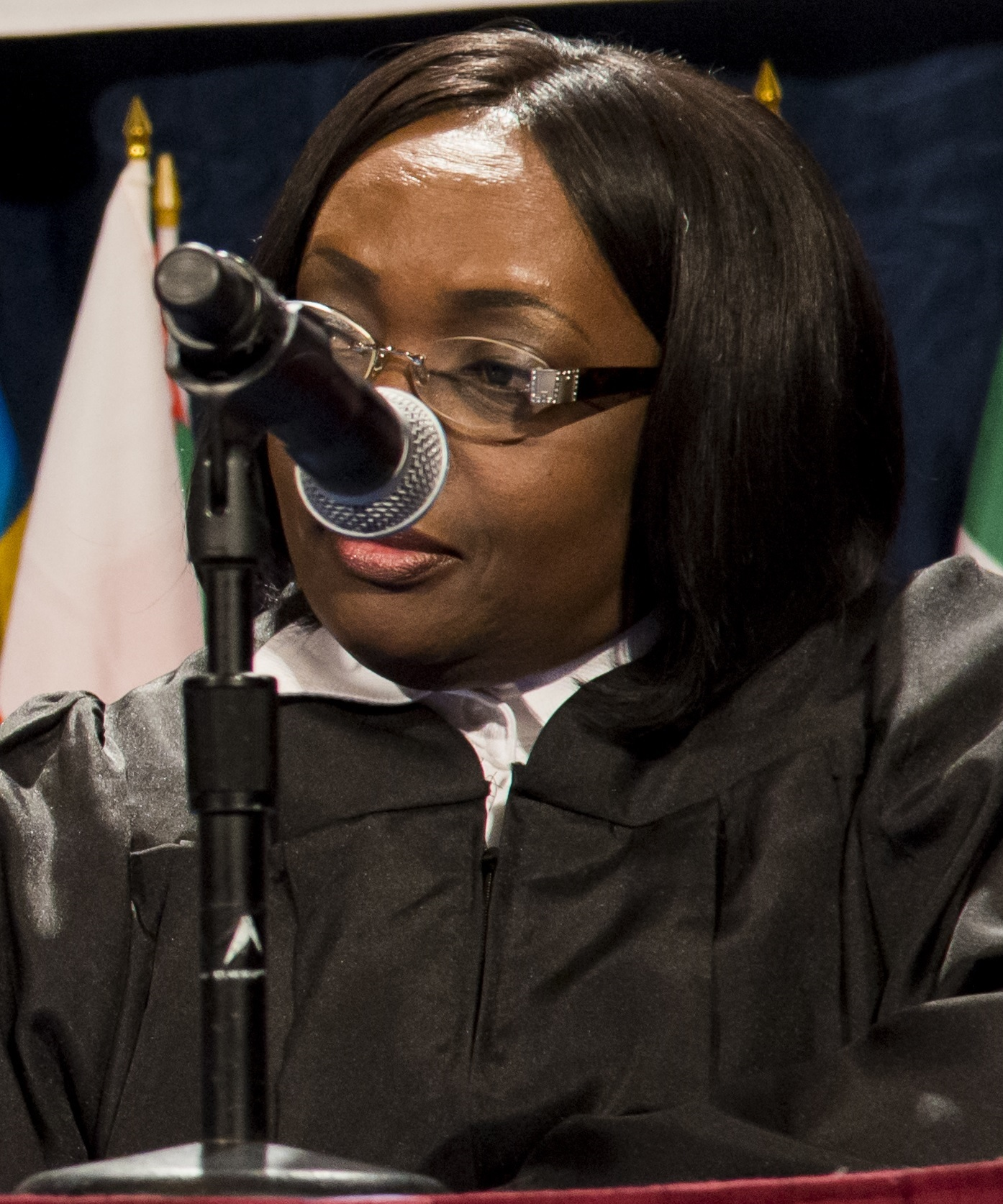
Julia Sebutinde, Vice-President and Judge of the International Court of Justice (2024–)
- James Clyde, Baron Clyde, former Lord of Appeal in Ordinary
- Henry Cockburn, Lord Cockburn, former Solicitor General for Scotland
- Paul Cullen, Lord Pentland, sitting justice on the Supreme Courts of Scotland
- William Cullen, Baron Cullen of Whitekirk, former Lord President of the Court of Session and Lord Justice General
- Raymond Doherty, Lord Doherty, sitting justice on the Supreme Courts of Scotland
- Unity Dow, former judge on the High Court of Botswana
- Sir David Edward, former judge of the Court of Justice of the European Union
- Thomas Addis Emmet, former New York State Attorney General
- Ian Fraser, Baron Fraser of Tullybelton, former Lord of Appeal in Ordinary
- John Garland, former Attorney General of New South Wales
- Brian Gill, Lord Gill, former Lord President of the Court of Session
- Henry Gollan, former Chief Justice of Hong Kong
- Arthur Hamilton, Lord Hamilton, former Lord President of the Court of Session and Lord Justice General
- Patrick Hodge, Lord Hodge, current Deputy President of the Supreme Court of the United Kingdom
- David Home of Crossrig, 17th-century judge and diarist
- David Hope, Baron Hope of Craighead, former Deputy President of the Supreme Court of the United Kingdom
- Nathaniel Lindley, Baron Lindley, former Lord of Appeal in Ordinary and Master of the Rolls
- Robert Lyall-Grant, former Attorney General of Kenya
- Atholl MacGregor, former Chief Justice of Hong Kong
- Alexander Mackenzie, barrister and writer on propaganda
- Hugh Macmillan, Baron Macmillan, former Lord of Appeal in Ordinary
- Duncan Menzies, Lord Menzies, sitting justice on the Supreme Courts of Scotland
- Frank Mulholland, Lord Mulholland, sitting justice on the Supreme Courts of Scotland
- Wilfrid Normand, Baron Normand, former Lord of Appeal in Ordinary
- Sir Alan Stewart Orr, former Lord Justice of Appeal
- David Richard Pigot, former Attorney General for Ireland
- Alipate Qetaki, former Attorney General of Fiji
- Michael Ramodibedi, former Chief Justice of the High Court of Swaziland
- Robert Reed, Baron Reed of Allermuir, current president of the Supreme Court of the United Kingdom
- Fred Ruhindi, former Attorney General of Uganda
- Sir Dudley Ryder, former Lord Chief Justice of the King's Bench
- Alexander Shand, 1st Baron Shand, former Lord of Appeal in Ordinary
- James Shaw, Baron Kilbrandon, former Lord of Appeal in Ordinary
- Alfred Henry Simpson, former Chief Justice of Kenya
- Julia Sebutinde, sitting Judge on the International Court of Justice
- Anne Smith, Lady Smith, sitting justice on the Supreme Courts of Scotland
- Alexander Mackenzie Stuart, Baron Mackenzie-Stuart, former president of the European Court of Justice
- Colin Sutherland, Lord Carloway, current Lord President of the Court of Session and Lord Justice General
- James Beveridge Thomson, former Chief Justice of Malaysia

== Military ==
=== Officers ===
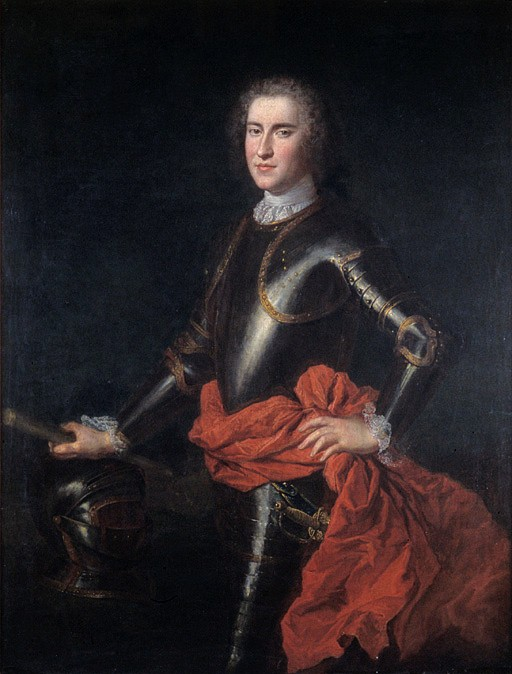
Generalfeldmarschall James Francis Edward Keith of the Prussian Army

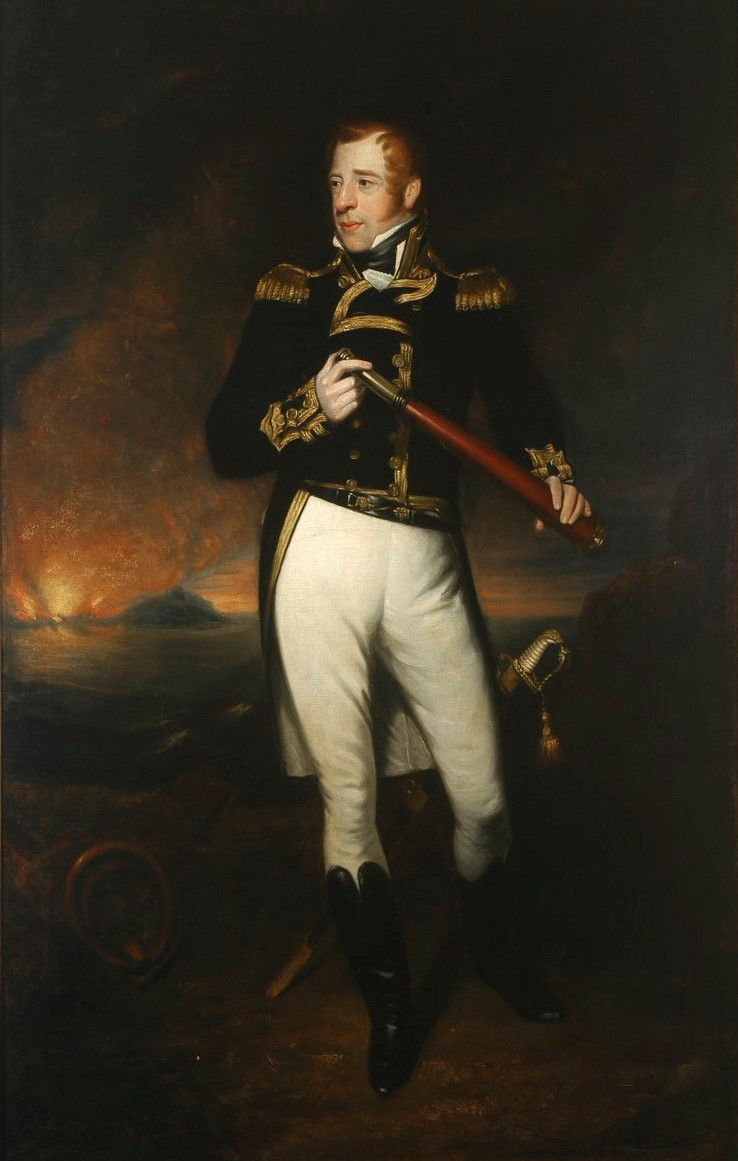
Admiral of the Red Lord Cochrane

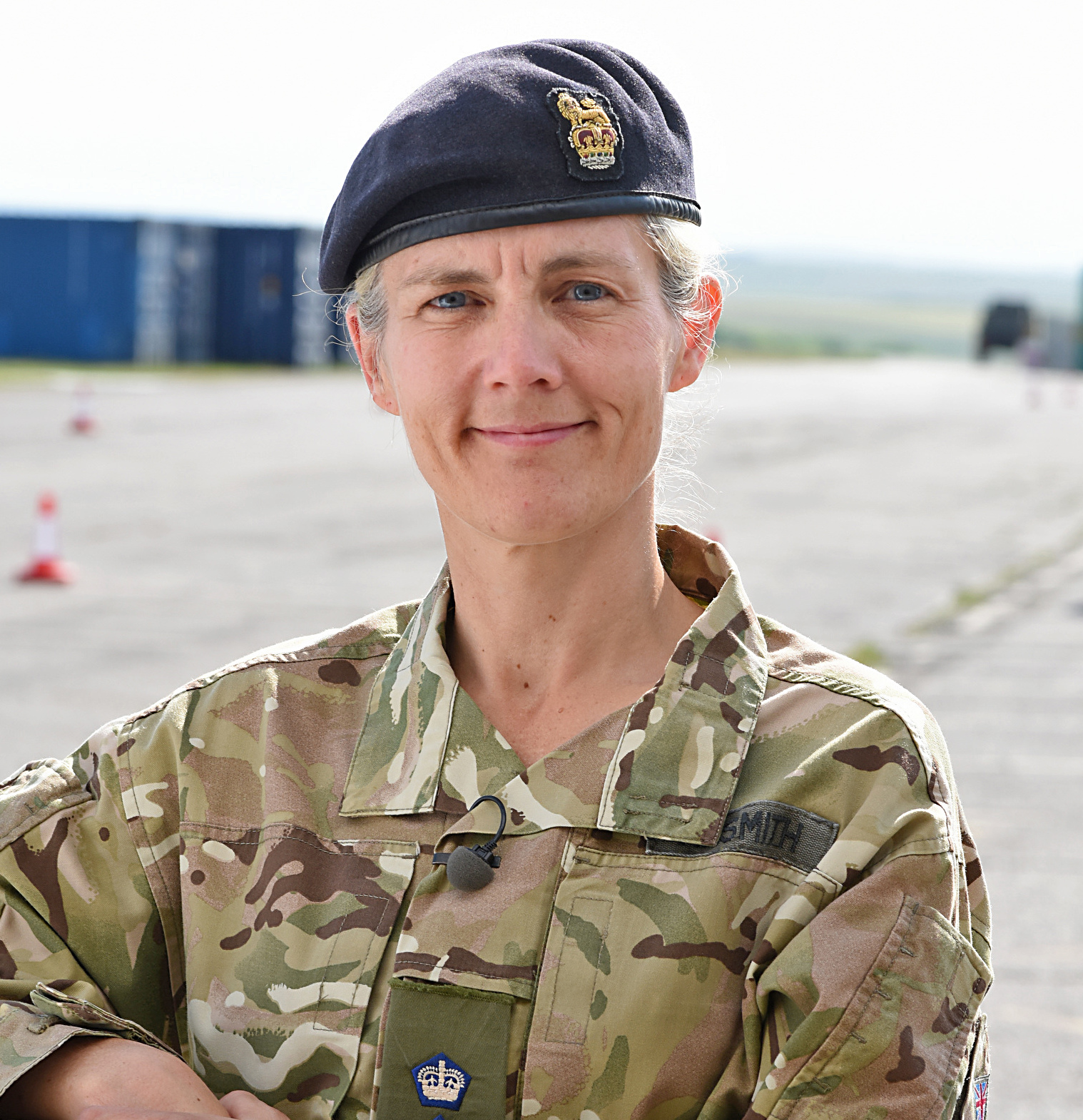
Sharon Nesmith, Vice-Chief of the Defence Staff

- Ralph Abercromby, MP, Commander-in-Chief, Ireland during the Irish Rebellion of 1798
- Sir Archibald Alison, 2nd Baronet, general
- Sir James Baird, lieutenant general, Director General Army Medical Services (1973–1977)
- Sir Hugh Beach, general, Deputy Commander-in-Chief Field Army (1976–1977)
- Thomas Cochrane, 10th Earl of Dundonald, Naval flag officer during the Napoleonic Wars and later Admiral of the Red, dubbed by Napoleon as le Loup des Mers, 'the Sea Wolf'
- David Coulter, major-general, Chaplain General of the British Army (2014–2018)
- Robert Craigie, admiral
- Sir Hew Whitefoord Dalrymple, general, Governor of Gibraltar (1806–1808)
- John Forbes, brigadier-general, commanded the Forbes Expedition during the French-Indian war
- Sir Alexander Hood, lieutenant-general, Director General Army Medical Services (1941–1948), Governor of Bermuda (1949–1955)
- John Hunter, vice-admiral of the red, governor of New South Wales (1795–1800)
- James Francis Edward Keith, Scottish Jacobite, served during the Seven Years' War under Frederick the Great as Generalfeldmarschall of the Prussian Army
- Daniel Knobel, lieutenant general, Surgeon General of the South African Defence Force (1988–1997)
- William Thompson Lusk, Assistant adjutant-general for the Union, American Civil War
- Gregor MacGregor, Army general, adventurer, and confidence trickster, known for his "Poyois scheme"
- Sir George Malcolm, general
- Sir Harold Martin, air marshal, Commander-in-Chief RAF Germany (1970–1973)
- Sir Ian McGeoch, vice-admiral
- Sir James McGrigor, responsible for the creation of the Royal Army Medical Corps
- Iain McNicoll, air marshal, Deputy Commander-in-Chief Operations, RAF Air Command (2007–2010)
- Sir Charles Napier, admiral, served in War of 1812, the Napoleonic Wars, and the Crimean War
- Dame Sharon Nesmith, first woman to command a British Army brigade, general and vice-chief of the General Staff (2024–)
- Arthur Edward Potts, major general, Commander of 6th Canadian Infantry Division (1942–1943)
- Philip Raffaelli, Surgeon-General of the United Kingdom Armed Forces (2009–2012)
- George Ramsay, 9th Earl of Dalhousie, governor of Canada (1820–1828), Commander-in-Chief, India (1830–1832)
- Alan Reay, lieutenant general, Director General Army Medical Services (1981–1984)
- Thomas Rimmer, air vice-marshal, commander, British Forces Cyprus (2000–2003)
- Sir James Simpson, general, Commander-in-Chief British troops in the Crimea (1855)
- Andrew Rutherford, 1st Earl of Teviot, lieutenant-general under Louis XIV when England was in Interregnum, governor of Tangier (1663–1664)
- Sir Charles Shaw, brigadier-general during the Portuguese Liberal Wars
- Adam Stephen, Scottish-American general in the Continental Army during the American Revolutionary War
- James Stuart, general, 1st General Officer Commanding, Ceylon (1796)
- Mona Chalmers Watson, head of Women's Army Auxiliary Corps
- Bennett H. Young, lieutenant, Confederate officer who led the St. Albans Raid during the American Civil War

=== Soldiers ===
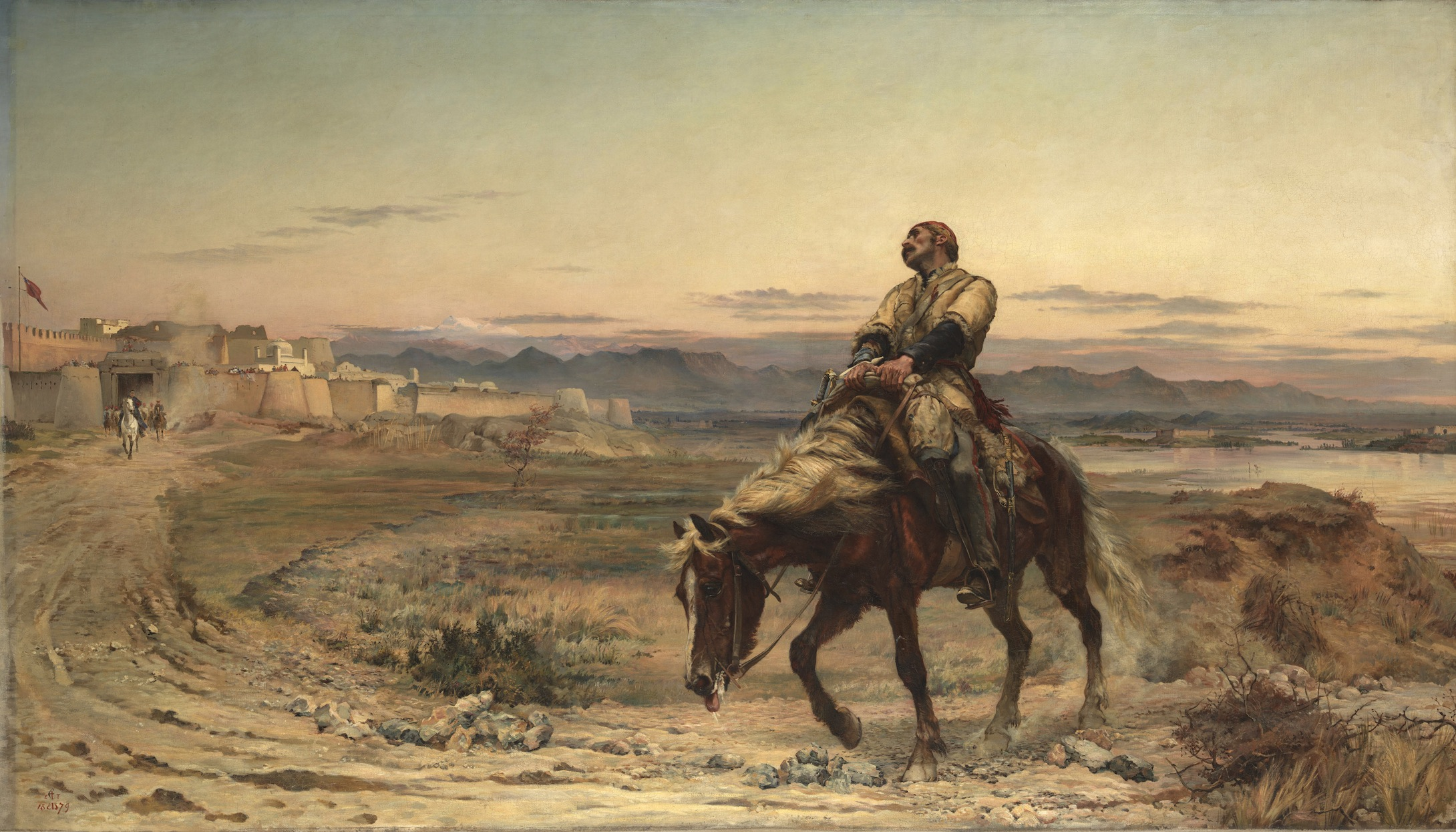
William Brydon

- Eric Brown, Royal Navy officer and test pilot who flew 487 types of aircraft, more than anyone else in history
- William Brydon, the only person to reach safety in the 1842 retreat from Kabul
- James Marr Brydone, Ship's surgeon of HMS Thunderer at Battle of Trafalgar
- Charles Gray Catto, World War I flying ace, later Mayor of Waco, Texas
- Gordon Duncan, Scottish flying ace
- James Oliver Ewart, intelligence officer, translator, and staff member of Field Marshal Bernard Montgomery
- John Todd, Scottish First World War flying ace credited with 18 aerial victories

=== Victoria Cross and George Cross recipients ===
Recipients of the Victoria Cross:

- Crimean War
  - William Henry Thomas Sylvester, major
- Indian Mutiny
  - James John McLeod Innes, lieutenant general
  - Valentine McMaster, Army surgeon
- Andaman Islands expedition
  - Campbell Mellis Douglas, lieutenant Colonel
- Second Boer War
  - Sir William Babtie, Lieutenant-general
  - Henry Edward Manning Douglas, major-general
- First World War
  - Allan Ker, major
  - Arthur Moore Lascelles, captain
  - David Lowe MacIntyre, captain
  - Harcus Strachan, lieutenant colonel

Recipients of the George Cross:

- Second World War
  - Douglas Ford, captain
  - John Fraser, major
  - Sandy Hodge, captain
  - Charles Howard, 20th Earl of Suffolk, bomb disposal expert

== Natural sciences, engineering and medicine ==
=== Astronomy ===
- John Campbell Brown, astronomer
- Hermann Brück, astronomer
- Mary Brück, astronomer, astrophysicist and historian of science
- Dame Jocelyn Bell Burnell, astrophysicist, co-discoverer of the first pulsars, 2018 winner of Special Breakthrough Prize in Fundamental Physics, Copley Medalist
- Ralph Copeland, discoverer of the Copeland Septet
- James Dunlop, astronomer, Herschel Medal winner in 2016
- Sir Frank Watson Dyson, whose observations during Solar eclipse of May 29, 1919 played an important role in proving Einstein's theory of General relativity
- James Gregory, discoverer of the infinite series and designer of the first practical reflecting telescope, the Gregorian telescope
- Thomas Henderson, first to measure the distance between Earth to Alpha Centauri
- Catherine Heymans, astrophysicist, incumbent Astronomer Royal for Scotland, Herschel Medal winner in 2022
- Chris Impey, astronomer
- Simon Lilly, astrophysicist, Herschel Medal winner in 2017
- James Lind of Windsor, natural philosopher
- Malcolm Longair, physicist
- William McCrea, astronomer
- John A. Peacock, astronomer, Shaw Prize laureate in 2014
- Anneila Sargent, astronomer
- Charles Piazzi Smyth, astronomer
- Licia Verde, cosmologist, 2018 winner of Breakthrough Prize in Fundamental Physics

=== Chemistry ===
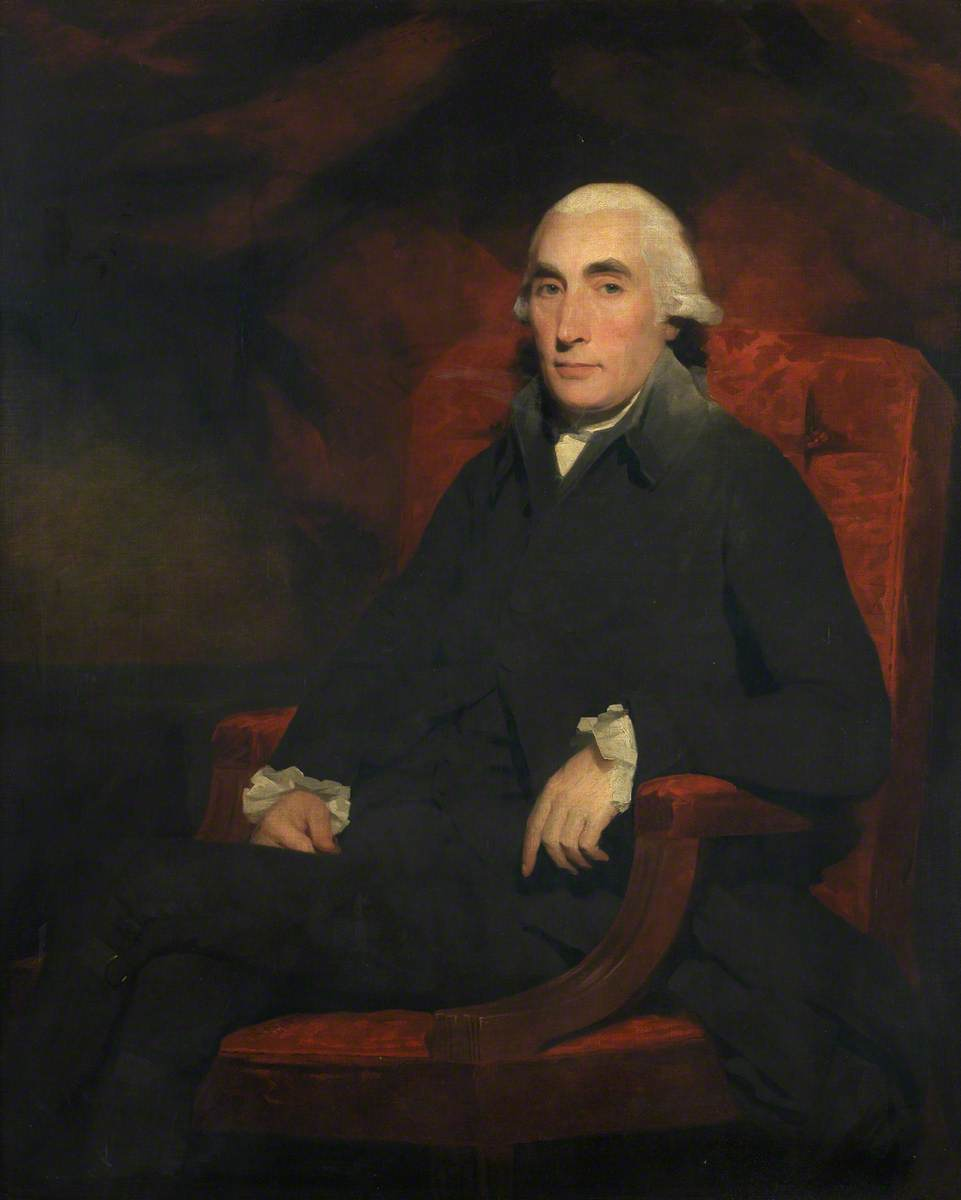
Joseph Black

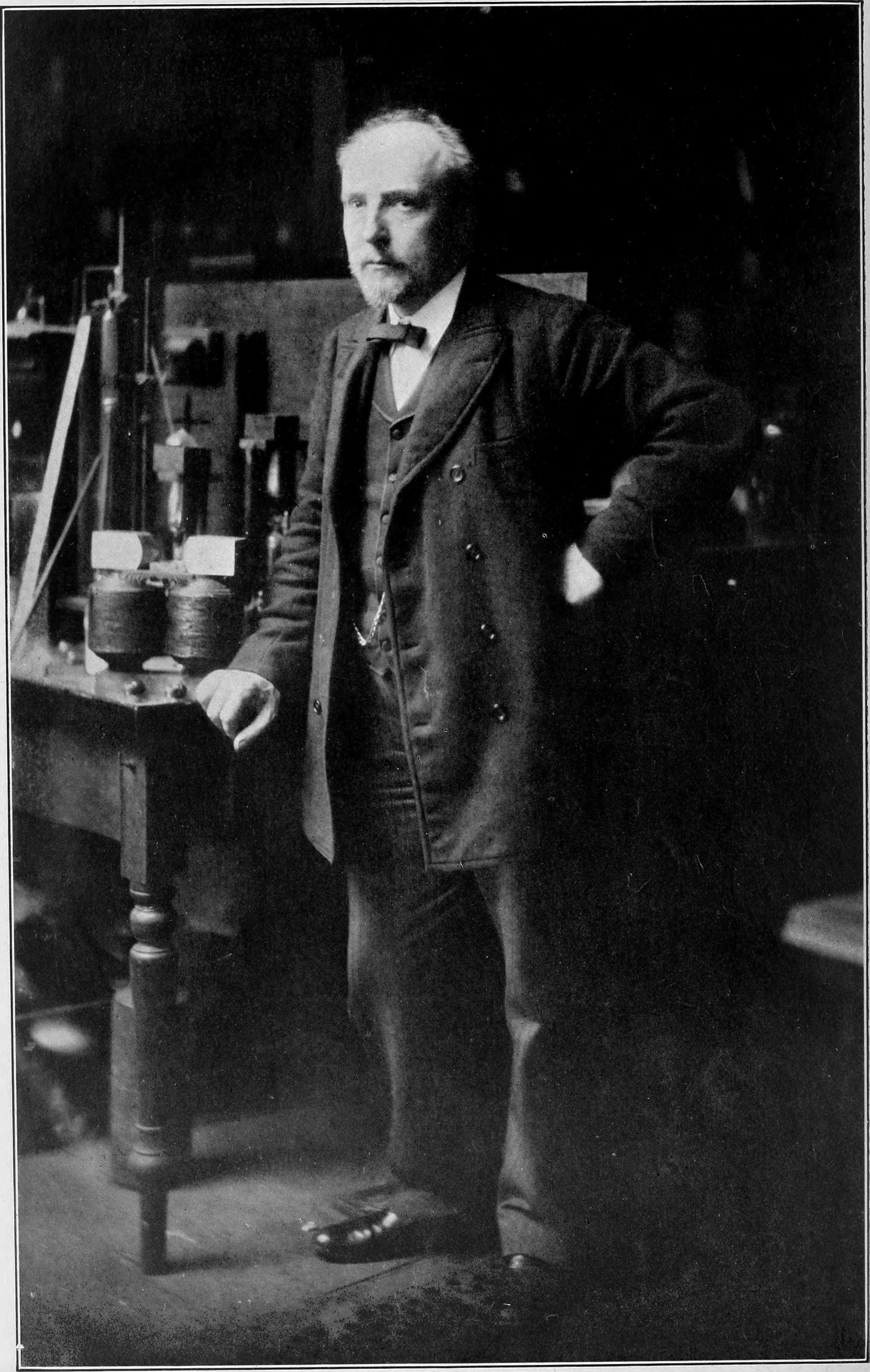
Sir James Dewar

- Thomas Anderson, discoverer of pyridine
- Polly Arnold, director of the chemical sciences division at Lawrence Berkeley National Laboratory
- Paul Attfield, Professor of Materials Science
- George Barger, chemist
- Wendy Bickmore, chemist
- Joseph Black, discoverer of magnesium, carbon dioxide, latent heat and specific heat
- Eleanor Campbell, Professor of Physical Chemistry
- Neil Campbell, chemist and amateur athlete
- Archibald Scott Couper, proposed an early theory of chemical structure and bonding
- Leroy Cronin, chemist
- John Davy, discoverer of phosgene
- Sir James Dewar, inventor of the Dewar flask
- Robin Ferrier, discoverer of Ferrier rearrangement and Ferrier carbocyclization
- Heinz Fraenkel-Conrat, biochemist
- Thomas Graham, formulator of Graham's law and inventor of dialysis
- Frederick Guthrie, synthesizer of Mustard gas
- Richard Henderson, pioneer in the field of electron microscopy, Nobel laureate in Chemistry in 2017
- William Henry, formulator of Henry's law
- Edmund Hirst, chemist
- Thomas Charles Hope, discoverer of strontium
- Narayan Hosmane, cancer researcher, BNCT
- David Leigh, Forbes Chair of Organic Chemistry at the University of Edinburgh 2001–2012, Feynman Prize in Nanotechnology winner in 2007
- Guy Lloyd-Jones, Forbes Chair of Organic Chemistry at the University of Edinburgh (2012–)
- Francis Robert Japp, discoverer of Japp-Klingemann reaction
- Charles Macintosh, chemist, inventor of the modern raincoat (Mackintosh)
- Christina Miller, synthesized phosphorus trioxide
- Peter D. Mitchell, discoverer of the chemiosmotic mechanism of ATP synthesis, Nobel laureate in Chemistry in 1978
- Sir Geoff Palmer, Jamaican-born scientist, brewing researcher and activist, first black professor in Scotland
- Sarah Pett, British immunopathologist and COVID-19 researcher
- William Prout, proposer of Prout's hypothesis, an early model of proton
- Sir Dai Rees, CEO of the Medical Research Council 1987–1996
- Prafulla Chandra Roy, distinguished chemist and founder of Bengal Chemicals & Pharmaceuticals
- Daniel Rutherford, discoverer of Nitrogen
- Benjamin Silliman, American chemist
- Sir James Fraser Stoddart, supramolecular chemist, Nobel laureate in Chemistry in 2016
- Smithson Tennant, discoverer of iridium and osmium
- Alexander Robertus Todd, Baron Todd, first synthesizer of adenosine triphosphate (ATP) and flavin adenine dinucleotide (FAD), Nobel laureate in Chemistry in 1957
- Vincent du Vigneaud, first synthesizer of oxytocin and Vasopressin, Nobel laureate in Chemistry in 1955
- Lorenz Florenz Friedrich von Crell, German chemist
- James Walker, chemist
- Kurt Wüthrich, developer of nuclear magnetic resonance (NMR) methods for studying biological macromolecules, Nobel laureate in Chemistry in 2002
- Lesley Yellowlees, first female president of the Royal Society of Chemistry

=== Geology ===
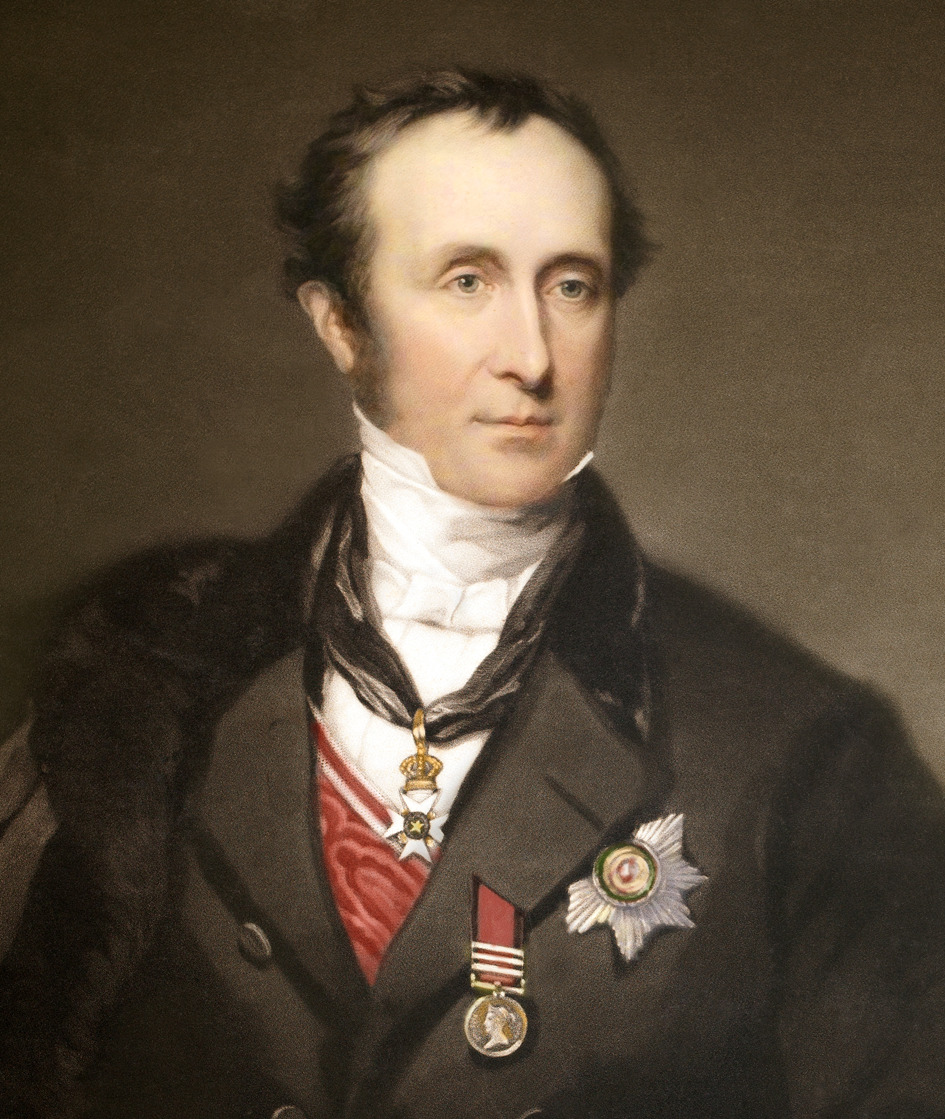
Sir Roderick Murchison

- Robert Bell, geologist
- Ami Boué, first to produce a Geological map of the world, Wollaston Medalist
- Sir John William Dawson, geologist
- Hugh Falconer, geologist and paleontologist, Wollaston Medalist
- John Flett, geologist, Wollaston Medalist
- James David Forbes, inventor of the Seismometer
- Sir Archibald Geikie, geologist, Wollaston Medalist
- Sir James Hector, geologist
- Arthur Holmes, geologist, Wollaston Medalist
- Wilfred Hudleston Hudleston, geologist, Wollaston Medalist
- James Hutton, father of modern geology
- Rosemary Hutton, geophysicist and pioneer of magnetotellurics
- Robert Jameson, naturalist and mineralist
- Sir William Edmond Logan, geologist, founder and first director of the Geological Survey of Canada, Wollaston Medalist
- Robert Cameron Mackenzie, geologist
- Sir Roderick Murchison, geologist, known for first describing the Silurian, Devonian and Permian systems, Copley Medalist
- William Nicol, inventor of Nicol prism
- Stan Paterson, glaciologist
- Anya Reading, geophysicist
- Justin B. Ries, American biogeochemist and inventor known for discoveries in the field of global oceanic change
- Frederick Stewart, geologist
- Erskine Douglas Williamson, known for his contribution to the Adams–Williamson equation

=== Computer science and informatics ===
==== Senior academic staff ====
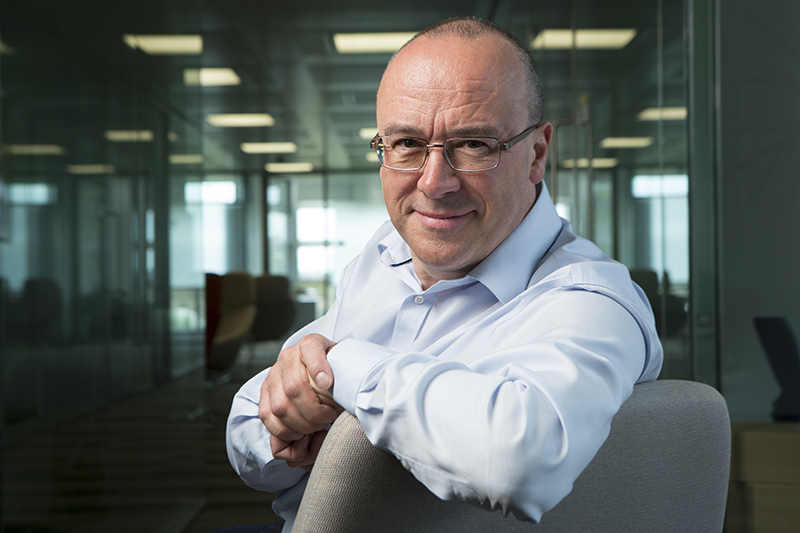
Christopher Bishop

- Malcolm Atkinson
- Christopher Bishop
- Alan Bundy
- Peter Buneman
- Rod Burstall, emeritus
- Kousha Etessami
- Wenfei Fan
- Michael Fourman
- Dragan Gasevic
- Igor Goryanin
- Jane Hillston
- Elham Kashefi
- Frank Keller
- Aggelos Kiayias
- Mirella Lapata
- Leonid Libkin
- Ursula Martin
- Johanna Moore
- Michael O'Boyle
- Gordon Plotkin
- Don Sannella
- Mark Steedman
- Keith Stenning
- Amos Storkey
- Austin Tate
- Sethu Vijayakumar
- Philip Wadler
- Barbara Webb
- Bonnie Webber

==== Former staff and alumni ====
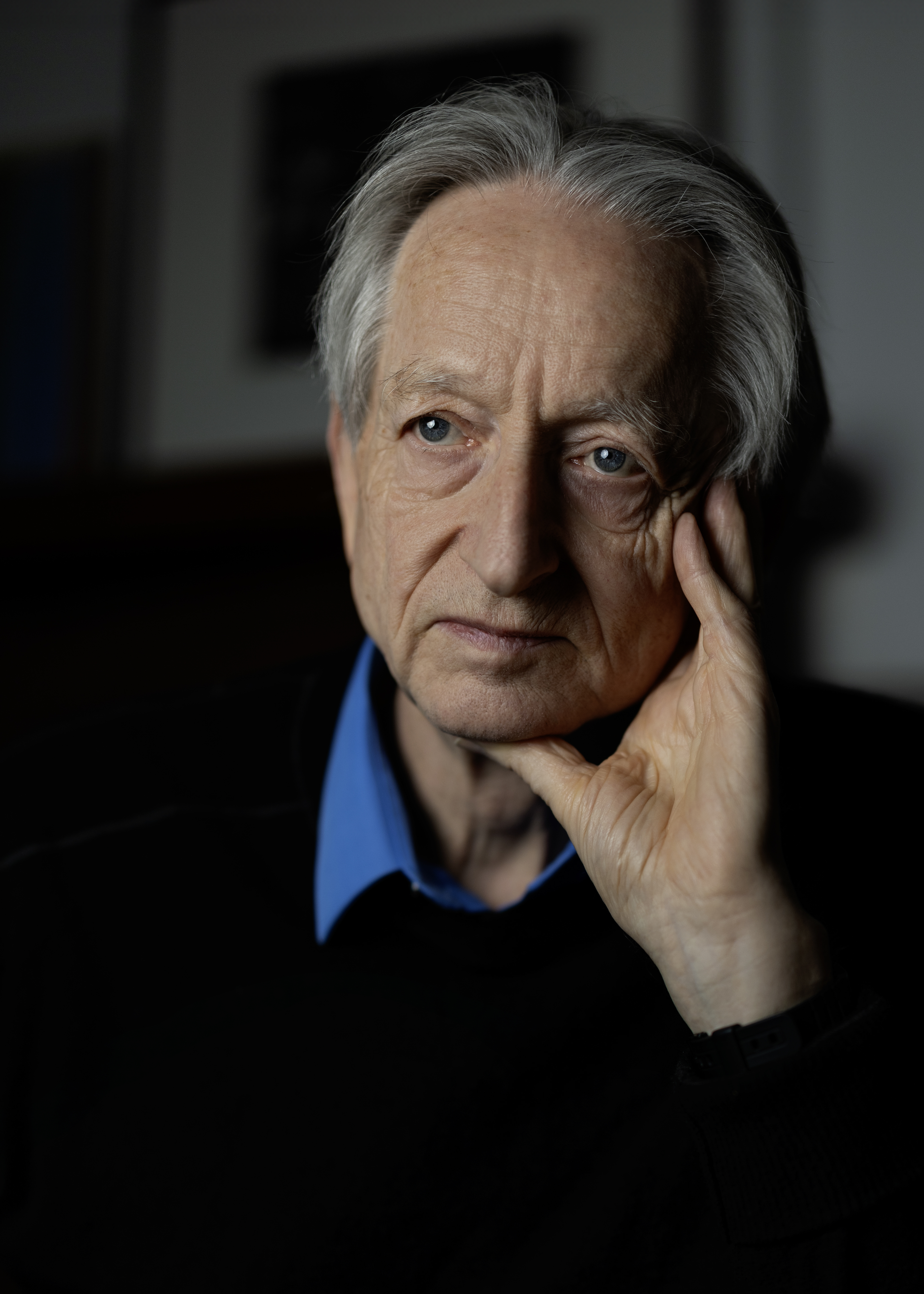
Geoffrey Hinton

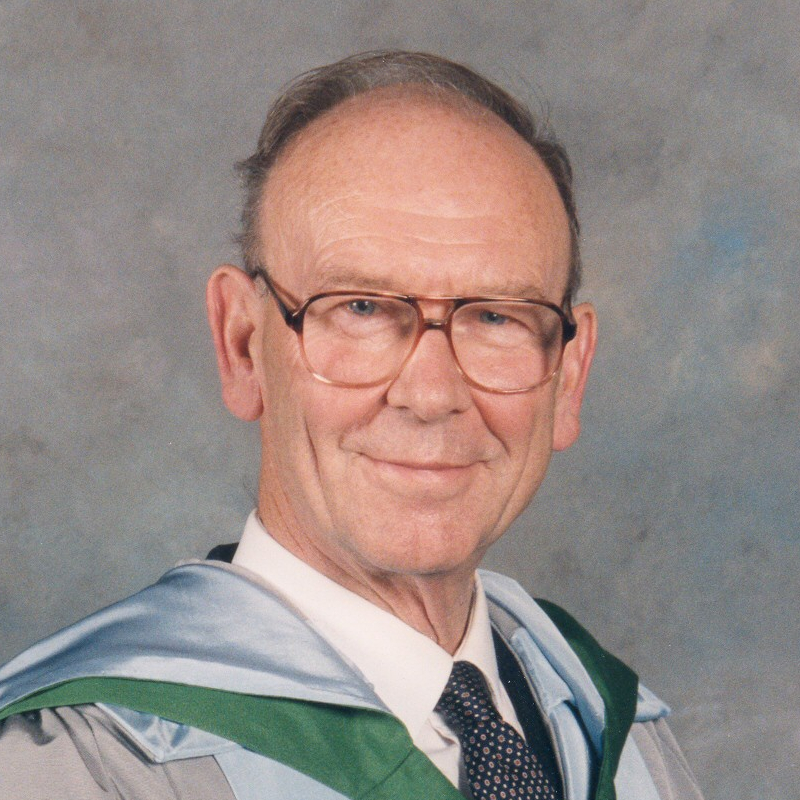
Donald Michie

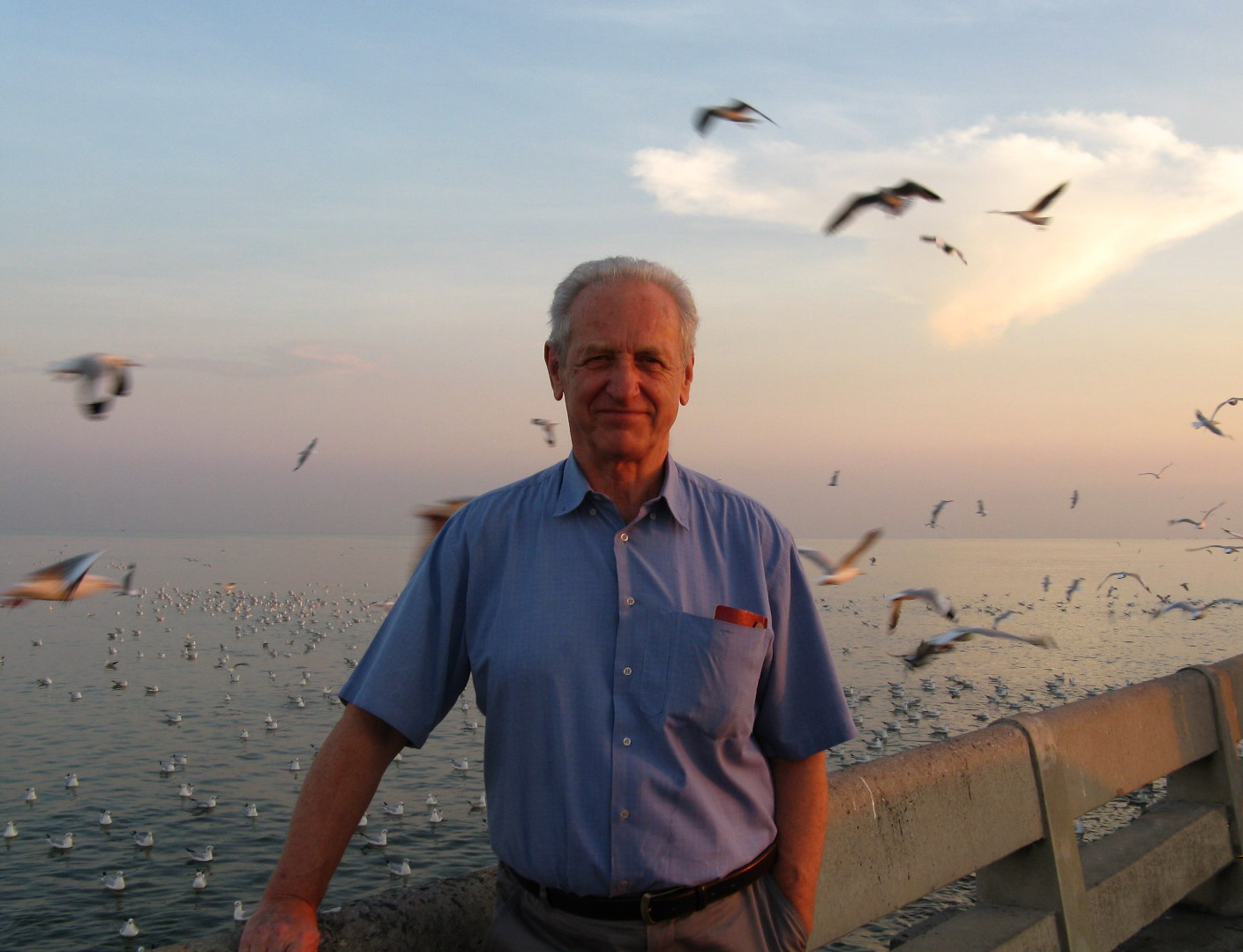
Robert Kowalski

- Samson Abramsky, computer scientist at the University of Oxford
- Pat Ambler, creator of Freddy II
- Joe Armstrong, creator of Erlang programming language and Open Telecom Platform (OTP)
- Andrew Blake, computer scientist and former director of Microsoft Research, Cambridge and Alan Turing Institute in London
- Bob Boyer, computer scientist, mathematician, philosopher at the University of Texas at Austin
- Alan W. Black, Professor at the Language Technologies Institute, Carnegie Mellon University
- Justine Cassell, Professor at the Human–Computer Interaction Institute, Carnegie Mellon University
- Luca Cardelli, computer scientist, Assistant Director of Microsoft Research, Cambridge
- Ian Clarke, creator of Freenet
- Rosemary Candlin, crystallographer and computer scientist at CERN
- Margarita Chli, Leader of the Vision for Robotics Lab at ETH Zürich
- Peter Dayan, director at the Max Planck Institute for Biological Cybernetics in Tübingen, Germany
- John Darlington, Emeritus Professor, Imperial College London
- Bruce Davie, CTO of VMware
- Vera Demberg, computational linguist and professor of computer science and computational linguistics at Saarland University
- Paul Dourish, professor at the University of California, Irvine
- Carla Gomes, computer scientist, Founding Director of the Cornell University Institute for Computational Sustainability
- Leslie Ann Goldberg, computer scientist at the University of Oxford
- Jeremy Gibbons, professor of computing, University of Oxford
- Andrew Gordon, at Microsoft Research
- Michael J. C. Gordon (1948–2017), computer scientist at the University of Cambridge
- Alex Graves, computer scientist at Google DeepMind, creator of Neural Turing machine (NTM)
- Philippa Gardner, Professor of Theoretical Computer Science at Imperial College London
- Richard Gregory (1923–2010), cognitive scientist at the University of Bristol
- Pat Hayes, senior research scientist at the Institute for Human and Machine Cognition in Pensacola, Florida
- Robert Harper, professor of computer science at Carnegie Mellon University
- Matthew Hennessy, Co-creator of Hennessy–Milner logic
- Geoffrey Hinton, "godfather of deep learning and artificial neural network", 2018 winner of the Turing Award
- Xuedong Huang, CTO of Microsoft Azure AI
- Auke Ijspeert, head of the Biorobotics Laboratory at EPFL
- Mark Jerrum, Professor of Pure mathematics at the University of London, Gödel Prize Laureate
- Mark H. Johnson, cognitive neuroscientist and brain–computer interface researcher, Head of the Department of Psychology at the University of Cambridge
- Philipp Koehn, Professor of Machine Translation at Johns Hopkins University
- Robert Kowalski, logician whose interpretation of the Horn clause at Edinburgh became instrumental in the creation of Prolog
- Lǐ Wèi, mathematician and computer scientist, President of Beihang University
- Christopher Longuet-Higgins (1923–2004), cognitive scientist
- Donald Michie, founder of Artificial Intelligence in the UK
- Robin Milner (1934–2010), computer scientist, developer of ML, π-calculus and LCF, winner of the Turing Award in 1991
- Eugenio Moggi, first to explicitly link the Monad of category theory to functional programming
- J Strother Moore, computer scientist at the University of Texas at Austin, co-developer of the Boyer–Moore string-search algorithm and the Boyer–Moore majority vote algorithm
- Stephen Muggleton, Head of the Computational Bioinformatics Laboratory at Imperial College London
- Alan Mycroft, professor at the Computer Laboratory, University of Cambridge
- Timothy O'Shea, Emeritus Professor and former principal and vice-chancellor of the University of Edinburgh
- Martha Palmer, creator of PropBank and VerbNet
- Benjamin C. Pierce, Henry Salvatori Professor of computer science at the University of Pennsylvania
- Robin Popplestone (1938–2004), creator of COWSEL and POP-2
- John C. Reynolds (1935–2013), inventor of System F and professor of computer science at Carnegie Mellon University
- Davide Sangiorgi, Professor at the University of Bologna
- Nigel Shadbolt, Chairman of the Open Data Institute (ODI) and master of Jesus College, Oxford
- Alistair Sinclair, Professor at University of California, Berkeley, Gödel Prize Laureate
- Aaron Sloman, philosopher, cognitive scientist at the University of Birmingham
- Chris Tofts, scientist at Hewlett-Packard
- Mads Tofte, professor at the IT University of Copenhagen
- Stephen Tweedie, software developer, creator of ext3 file system
- Leslie Valiant, Complexity theory pioneer, winner of the Turing Award in 2010
- Hanna Wallach, at Microsoft Research
- Lincoln Wallen, CTO of Improbable, former CTO of DreamWorks Animation
- Toby Walsh, professor of artificial intelligence at the UNSW
- David H. D. Warren, creator of the Warren Abstract Machine
- Xia Peisu, "mother of computer science in China"
- Andrew Zisserman, computer scientist at Google DeepMind and University of Oxford

=== Engineering ===
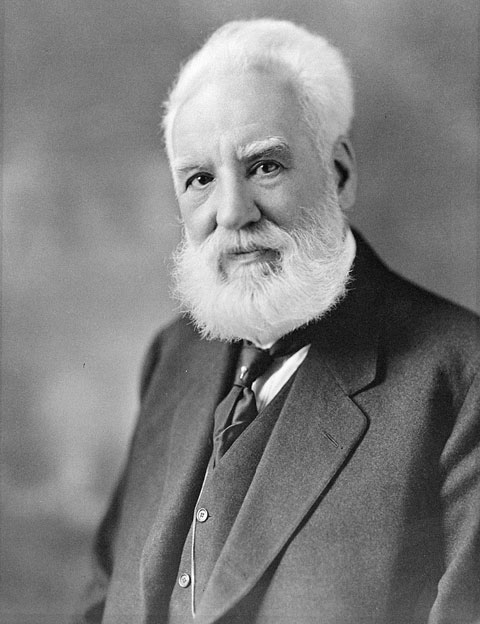
Alexander Graham Bell

- Sir Thomas Hudson Beare, engineer
- George Thomas Beilby, chemical engineer
- Alexander Graham Bell, engineer, inventor of the telephone and founder of AT&T
- Isaac Lowthian Bell, metallurgist, businessman and politician
- George Parker Bidder, engineer and calculating prodigy
- James Blyth, electrical engineer, pioneer of the Wind Turbine
- Peter Chalmers Cowan, civil engineer
- Kenneth Denbigh, Chemical engineer
- William Fothergill Cooke, engineer, founder of Electric Telegraph Company
- Sir James Alfred Ewing, engineer and physicist, discoverer of Hysteresis
- Lewis Gordon, civil engineer
- Harald Haas, inventor of Li-Fi
- Sir John Jackson, civil engineer and MP
- James Jardine, civil engineer
- Fleeming Jenkin, engineer, inventor of telpherage
- Alexander Carnegie Kirk, marine engineer
- David Milne, microelectronics engineer and entrepreneur
- Elijah McCoy, engineer, inventor of the Automatic lubricator for Steam Engines
- James Newlands, civil engineer
- John Randall, inventor of Cavity Magnetron and leader of the team that led to the discovery of structure of DNA
- William John Macquorn Rankine, engineer, physicist, and early contributor to the development of thermodynamics
- George Rennie, engineer
- John Rennie the Elder, civil engineer
- John Scott Russell, civil engineer, discoverer of Soliton
- Stephen Salter, wave energy pioneer
- John Shepherd-Barron, inventor of the automated teller machine (ATM)
- Alan Stevenson, lighthouse engineer
- Charles Alexander Stevenson, lighthouse engineer
- David Stevenson, lighthouse designer
- David Alan Stevenson, lighthouse engineer
- Robert Stephenson, railway engineer
- Robert Stevenson, civil engineer
- Thomas Stevenson, lighthouse engineer
- Robert Stirling, inventor of Stirling engine
- William Symington, engineer and inventor
- Maria Watkins (née Marja Ludwika Ziff) first woman to study electrical engineering there, president of the Women's Engineering Society

=== Mathematics and physics ===
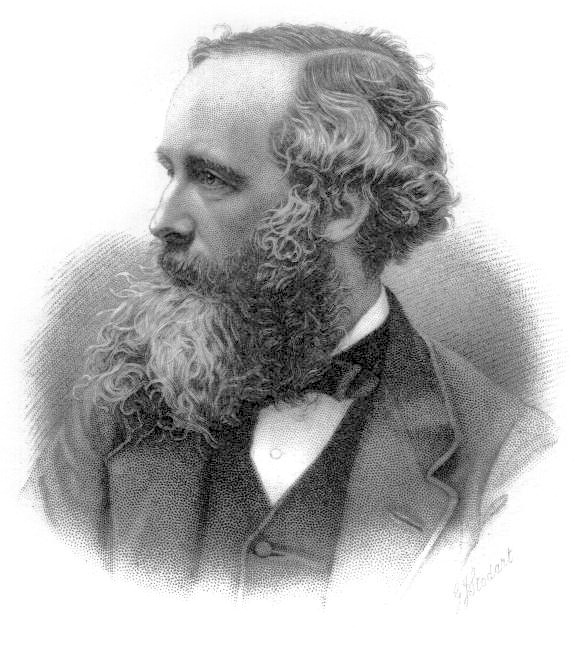
James Clerk Maxwell

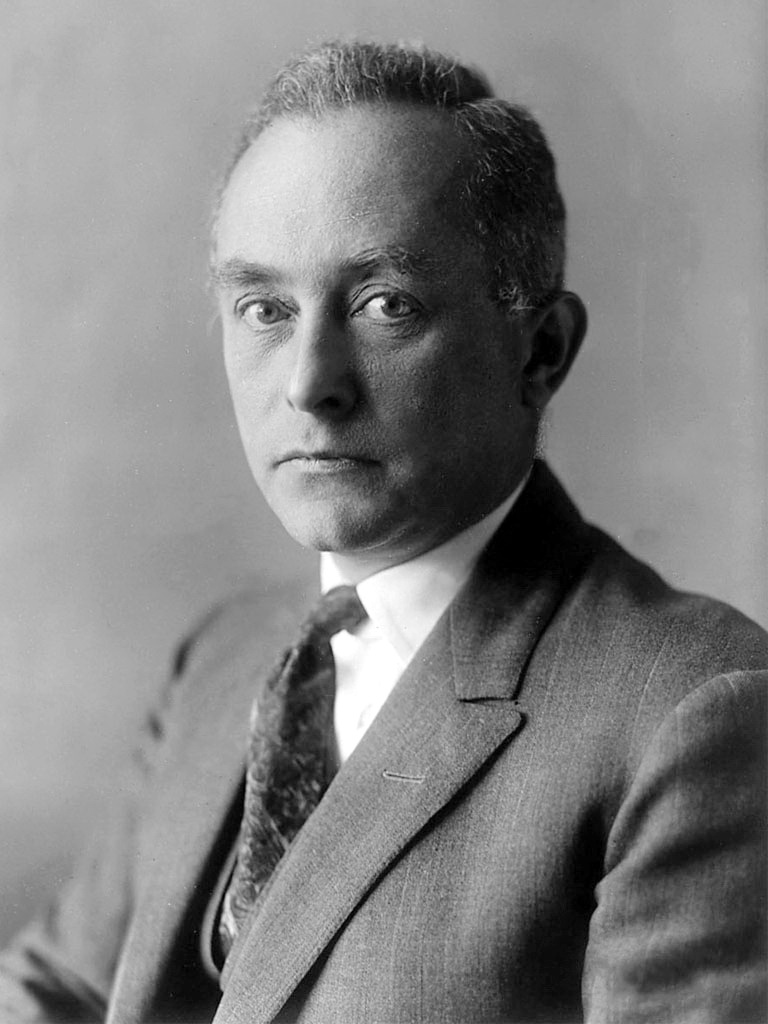
Max Born

- Alexander Aitken, mathematician, worked in Hut 6 Bletchley Park decrypting the ENIGMA code, known for the Aitken's delta-squared process
- Sir Michael Atiyah mathematician, Fields Medallist in 1966, Abel Prize winner 2004
- Sir John M. Ball, mathematician
- Charles Glover Barkla, winner of the Nobel Prize in Physics in 1917 for his work in X-ray spectroscopy and related areas in the study of X-rays
- Thomas Bayes, mathematician, known for Bayes' theorem and Bayesian Statistics
- Max Born, principal founder of Quantum mechanics and Nobel laureate in Physics in 1954
- Sir David Brewster, physicist, discoverer of Brewster's angle and photoelasticity, inventor of Kaleidoscope
- J. W. S. Cassels, mathematician
- Michael Cates, physicist known for his work in soft matter
- Cheng Kaijia, physicist and pioneer of nuclear technology in China
- George Chrystal, mathematician
- Roger Cowley, physicist
- Sir Charles Galton Darwin, director of the National Physics Laboratory (NPL) during World War II
- Janette Dunlop, physicist and teacher
- Sir James Alfred Ewing, physicist and engineer, discoverer of Hysteresis
- Norman Feather, physicist
- Klaus Fuchs, theoretical physicist and atomic spy
- Fabiola Gianotti, Director-general of CERN, 2013 winner of Special Breakthrough Prize in Fundamental Physics
- Marion Cameron Gray, mathematician
- David Gregory, mathematician, early Newtonian
- Peter Higgs, 2013 Nobel laureate in Physics, theoretical physicist, Emeritus Professor, and theorist of the Higgs Boson, Higgs Mechanism and Higgs Field
- Sir W. V. D. Hodge, mathematician and Copley Medalist, formulator of the Hodge theory and Hodge conjecture, one of the seven Millennium Prize Problems
- Huang Kun, physicist, co-formulator of the Born-Huang approximation
- Charles Hutton, mathematician and Copley Medalist
- James Ivory, mathematician and Copley Medalist
- Philip Kelland, mathematician
- Nicholas Kemmer, contributor in United Kingdom's nuclear programme
- Tom W. B. Kibble, theoretical physicist, Sakurai Prize winner in 2010
- Sir John Leslie, mathematician and physicist, the first producer of artificial ice
- Terry Lyons, mathematician
- Colin Maclaurin, mathematician, discoverer of MacLaurin series
- James Clerk Maxwell, physicist, "father of electromagnetism and Statistical mechanics"
- Dusa McDuff, mathematician
- David Olive, theoretical physicist and string theorist, 1997 Dirac Medal and Prize winner
- Sir Alexander Oppenheim, mathematician
- Peng Huanwu, physicist and pioneer of nuclear technology in China
- John Playfair, mathematician
- John Polkinghorne, theoretical physicist and theologian, Templeton Prize winner in 2002
- William John Macquorn Rankine, engineer, physicist, and early contributor to the development of thermodynamics
- John Robison, physicist
- Marion Ross, physicist
- Sir Joseph Rotblat, Polish physicist who worked in the Manhattan Project, 1995 Nobel Laureate in Peace
- Agata Smoktunowicz, mathematician
- Peter Guthrie Tait, physicist and pioneer in Thermodynamics
- Igor Tamm, theorizer of Phonon and designer of Tomahak, won the 1958 Nobel Prize in Physics for discovering the Cherenkov radiation
- Sheila Tinney, mathematical physicist
- Neil Turok, theoretical physicist, Director of the Perimeter Institute for Theoretical Physics (2009–2019)
- Arthur Geoffrey Walker, mathematician, known for co-developing the Friedmann–Lemaître–Robertson–Walker metric and Fermi–Walker differentiation
- Joseph Wedderburn, mathematician
- Sir Edmund Whittaker, mathematician and historian of science, Copley Medalist
- Emil Wolf, physicist, one-half of Born and Wolf
- Shu Xingbei, physicist
- Thomas Young, polymath, established the wave theory of light through his double-slit experiment

=== Medicine and biology ===
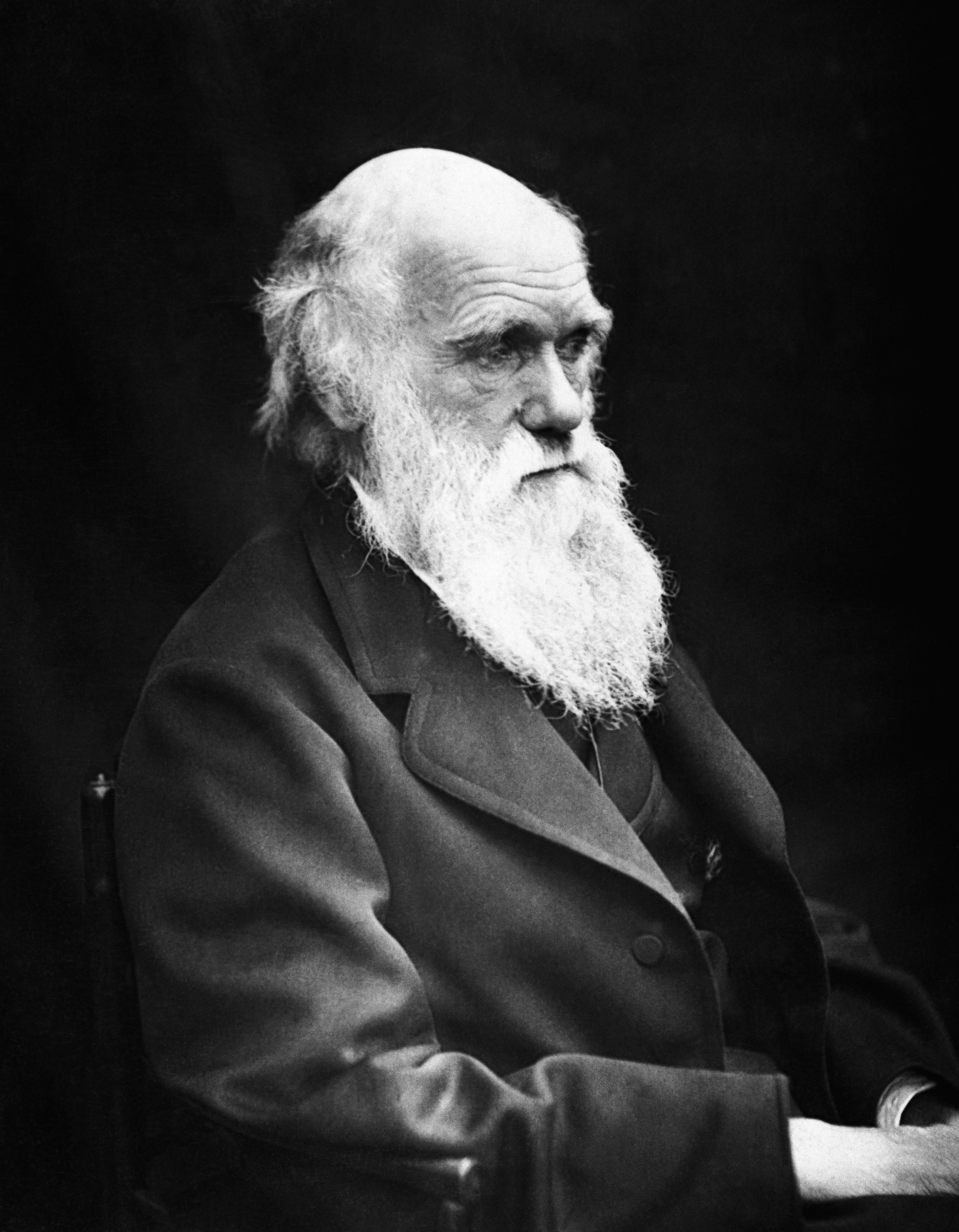
Charles Darwin

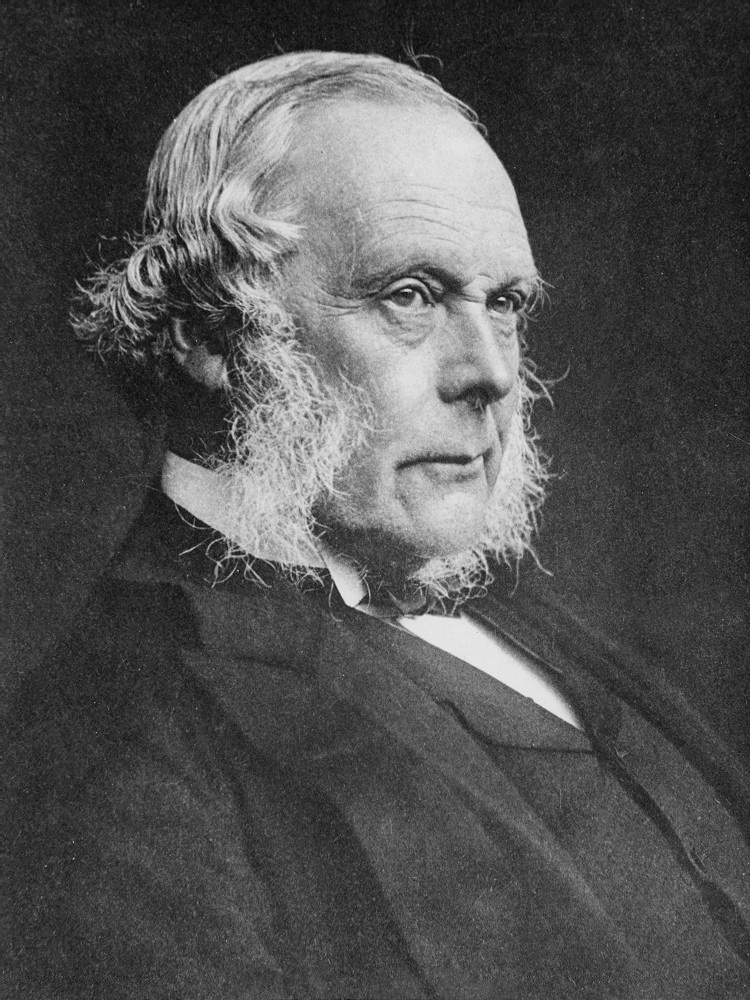
Joseph Lister

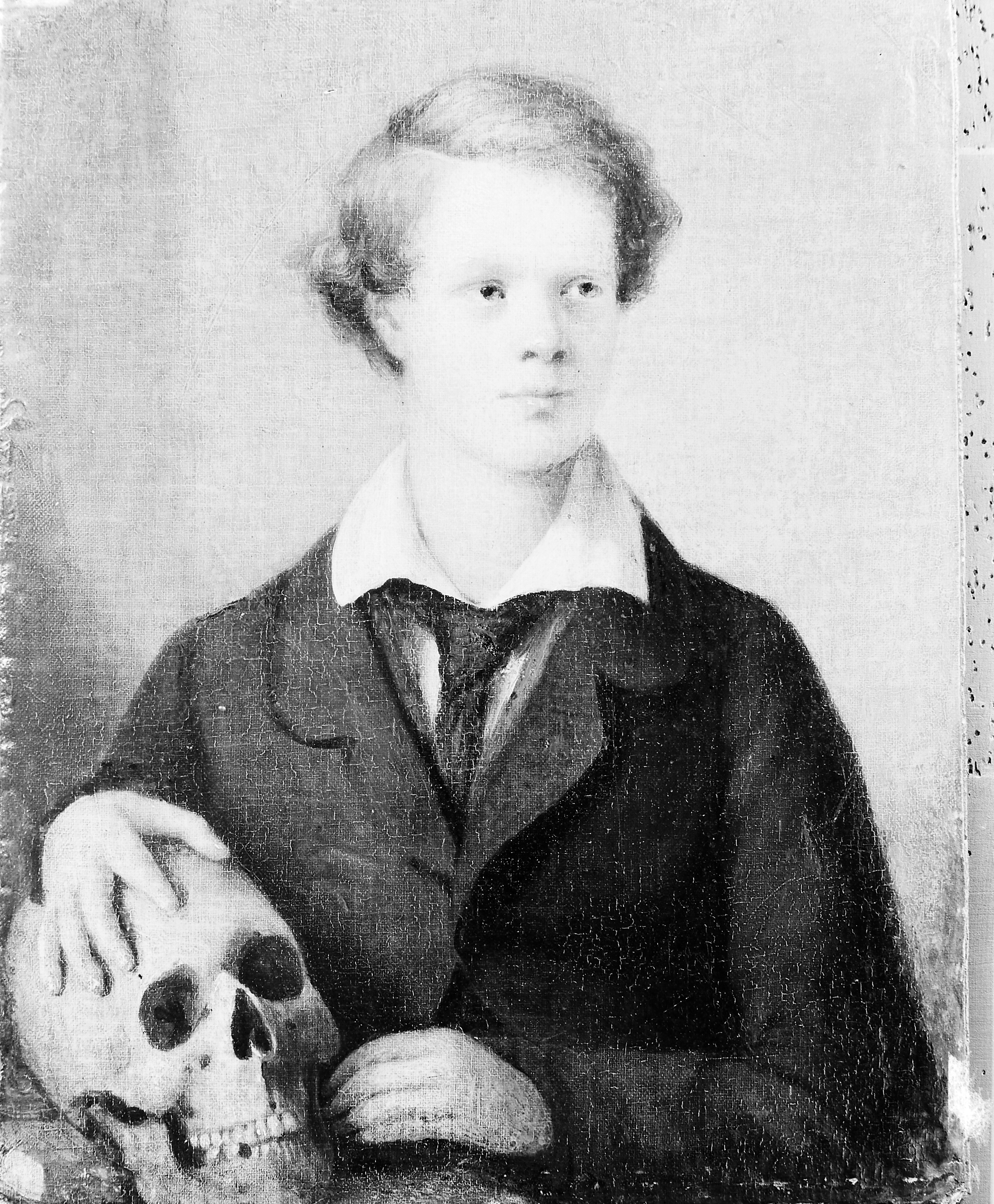
Robert Liston

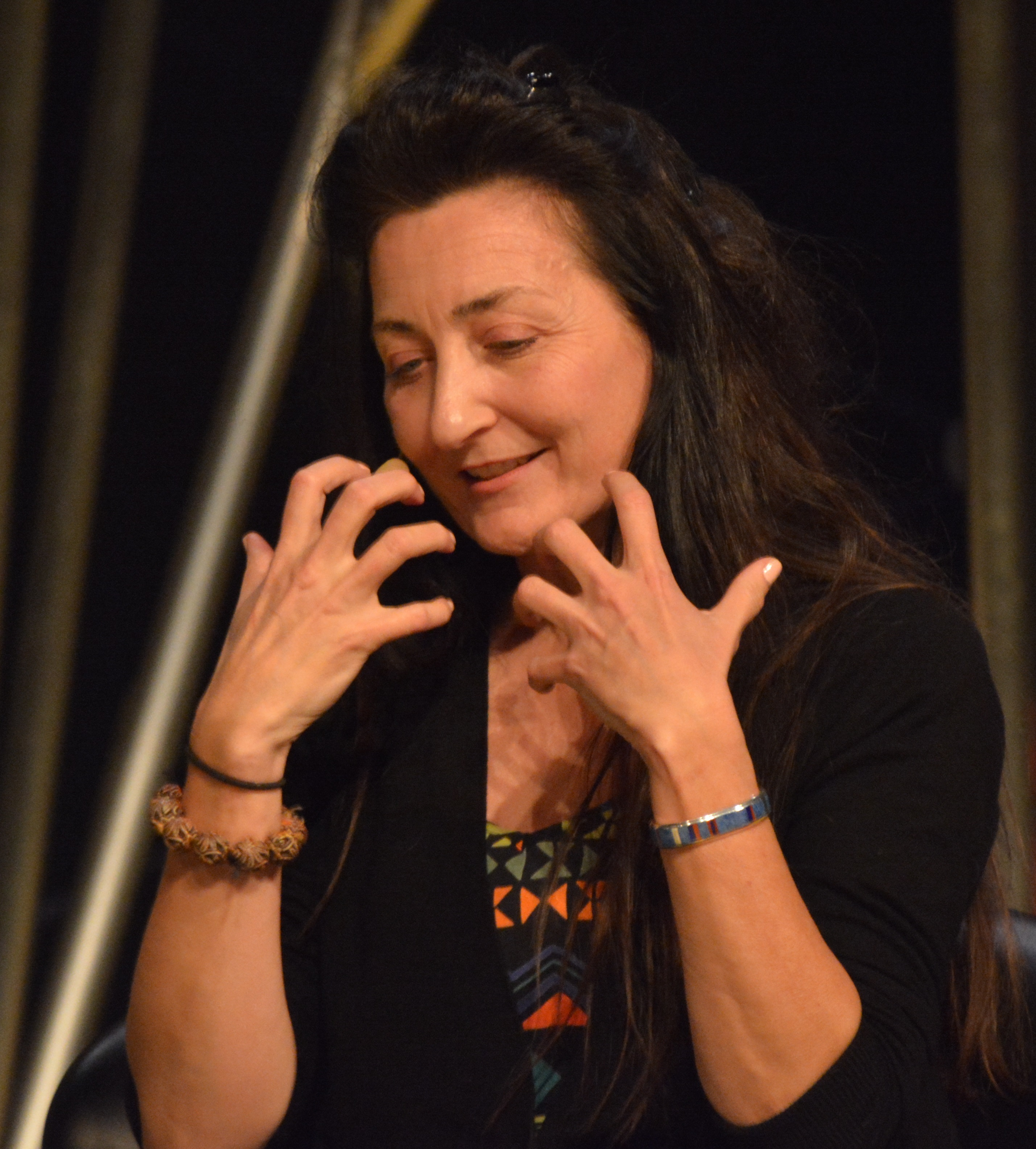
May-Britt Moser

- Thomas Addis, pioneer in nephrology
- Thomas Addison, first described Addison's disease, pernicious anemia and Addison-Schilder syndrome
- William John Adie, first described Adie syndrome and narcolepsy
- Arthur Cecil Alport, first identifier of the Alport syndrome
- Kenneth Baillie, intensive care physician
- John Hutton Balfour, botanist
- Alfred George Barrs, physician
- Benjamin Smith Barton, botanist
- Nick Barton, evolutionary biologist, winner of the Darwin–Wallace Medal in 2008
- Sir David Baulcombe, plant scientist, discovered SiRNA and its role in gene silencing in plants, winner of the Lasker Award in 2008
- Sir John Beddington, population biologist, UK Government Chief Scientific Adviser
- Charles Bell, anatomist and surgeon, first described of Bell's palsy
- Joseph Bell, surgeon
- Seneka Bibile, influential Sri Lankan pharmacologist
- Sir Adrian Bird, geneticist, discovered the protein MeCP2 involved in DNA methylation, Canada Gairdner International Award winner in 2011, Shaw Prize laureate in 2016
- Alice Bloomfield, gynaecological surgeon
- James Braid, surgeon, founder of hypnosis in medicine
- Robert Brown, botanist, discoverer of Brownian motion
- David Bruce, discoverer of Brucella
- William Speirs Bruce, naturalist and oceanographer, led the Scottish National Antarctic Expedition in 1902-04
- Stephen L. Brusatte, paleontologist and evolutionary biologist
- William Budd, physician and epidemiologist
- Keith Campbell, biologist, Shaw Prize laureate in 2008
- John Murray Carnochan, neurosurgeon, performed first successful surgery for trigeminal neuralgia
- Min Chueh Chang, inventor of Combined oral contraceptive pill and pioneer in IVF, Lasker Award winner in 1954
- Brian Charlesworth, evolutionary biologist, winner of the Darwin–Wallace Medal in 2010
- Virender Lal Chopra, geneticist and biotechnologist
- Bryan Clarke, geneticist, winner of the Darwin–Wallace Medal in 2008
- John G. S. Coghill, doctor
- Richard A Collins, biochemist and author
- Robin Coombs, immunologist, discoverer of the Coombs test
- Hilary Critchley, obstetrician and gynaecologist
- William Cullen, physician and professor of medicine
- Rafael Antonio Curra, Venezuelan ichthyologist
- Charles Darwin, naturalist, author of The Origin of Species
- James Douglas, physician and anatomist; the Douglas pouch and Douglas line are named for him
- Cuthbert Dukes, pathologist and author
- Richard Eastell, professor of bone medicine
- Robert Edwards, pioneer in IVF, 2010 winner of Nobel Prize in Physiology or Medicine
- John Elliotson, physician, mesmerist
- James Esdaile, surgeon, mesmerist
- Emmanuel Evans-Anfom, Ghanaian doctor and vice-chancellor of Kwame Nkrumah University
- Ronald Fairbairn, psychiatrist and psychoanalyst, known for his Object Relations Theory
- Heather M. Ferguson, malaria vector biologist
- Sir David Ferrier, neuroscientist
- Charles ffrench-Constant, neurologist
- Ian Frazer, immunologist, developer of the HPV vaccine
- Wong Fun, first western-educated Chinese doctor
- Dame Anne Glover, Chief Scientific Adviser to the President of the European Commission 2012–2014
- Rosemary Grant, evolutionary biologist, 2009 winner of Darwin-Wallace Medal
- Helen Gregory (medical missionary), medical missionary to India
- Michael Grunstein, biochemist, 2018 winner of Lasker Award
- John Haldane, physiologist
- William Hewson, founder of haematology, Copley Medalist
- Bill Hill, geneticist and statistician, winner of 2018 Darwin Medal
- Thomas Hodgkin, physician, first describer of Hodgkin's lymphoma
- James Africanus Beale Horton, medicine
- David Hosack, American botanist and landscape architect
- William Hunter, anatomist
- Sophia Jex-Blake, leader of the Edinburgh Seven, pioneer of medical education for women in Britain
- Steve Jones, geneticist
- George Kelly, psychologist
- Kurt Koffka, psychologist, founder of Gestalt psychology
- Sir John Liddell, physician and director-general of the Medical Department of the Royal Navy
- James Lind, naturalistphysician to George III
- James Lind, pioneer in preventive medicine, theorized the cure for scurvy
- Joseph Lister, 1st Baron Lister, introduced antiseptics into surgery
- Winifred W. Logan, nurse theorist
- John Claudius Loudon, botanist
- Mary F. Lyon, discoverer of Lyonization, winner of 1997 Wolf Prize in Medicine
- Ian MacDonald, physician
- William Sutherland Macdonald, physician and soldier
- George Mackay, ophthalmic surgeon
- Trudy Mackay, quantitative geneticist, winner of the Wolf Prize in Agriculture in 2016
- William Alexander Mackay, doctor
- Aubrey Manning, zoologist
- Samuel Manuwa, Nigerian doctor and president of the World Federation for Mental Health
- Major-General James Fitzgerald Martin, surgeon to The King and to the Viceroy of India
- Henry Johnston Scott Matthew, physician, toxicologist
- Kirsten McCaffery, public health researcher
- Dame Anne McLaren, developmental biologist
- Roger McNeil, doctor of public health
- Gilean McVean, post-doctoral fellow, evolutionary biologist, member of the steering committee for the 1000 Genomes Project
- Kath M. Melia, sociologist, professor of nursing, champion of ethics in healthcare
- Pleasantine Mill, cell biologist
- May-Britt Moser, 2014 winner of Nobel Prize in Physiology or Medicine for her discoveries in grid cell
- Edvard Moser, 2014 winner of Nobel Prize in Physiology or Medicine for his discoveries in grid cell
- B. K. Misra, neurosurgeon
- John Keith Moffat, Guggenheim Fellow, biologist and former Deputy Provost at University of Chicago, noted for Advanced Photon Source and Time resolved crystallography
- Alexander Monro (primus), (secundus) and (tertius), anatomists
- Hermann Joseph Muller, 1946 winner of Nobel Prize in Physiology or Medicine for his discoveries in mutagenesis
- Kim Nasmyth, geneticist, 2018 winner of Breakthrough Prize in Life Sciences
- Sir Paul Nurse, geneticist, 2001 Winner of Nobel Prize in Physiology or Medicine
- Susan Ofori-Atta, first Ghanaian woman doctor
- Sarah Otto, theoretical biologist, 2021 winner of Darwin-Wallace Medal
- Richard Owen, major opponent to Charles Darwin, known for coining the term Dinosauria and presenting them as a distinct taxonomic group
- Josephine Pemberton, evolutionary biologist, 2018 winner of Darwin-Wallace Medal
- George Alexander Pirie, doctor
- Richard Frank Rand, surgeon
- David Robertson, virologist and bioinformatician
- John Rogerson, personal physician to Catherine the Great
- Nancy Roper, nurse theorist
- Michael Rosbash, 2017 winner of Nobel Prize in Physiology or Medicine
- Fiona Ross, nursing scholar
- William Roxburgh, botanist
- Agnes Yewande Savage, first West African woman graduate and doctor
- Richard Gabriel Akinwande Savage, doctor and soldier
- Randy Schekman, former editor-in-chief of Proceedings of the National Academy of Sciences (PNAS) and 2013 winner of Nobel Prize in Physiology or Medicine
- Edward Albert Sharpey-Schafer, physiologist and neuroscientist, founder of Endocrinology, Copley Medalist
- Robert Sibbald, Professor of Medicine
- Sir James Young Simpson, pioneered the use of chloroform in midwifery
- Leslie Skene, psychiatrist
- James Edward Smith, founder of the Linnean Society
- Jeremy Smith, biological scientist
- Jotello Festiri Soga, South Africa's first black veterinarian
- Sahib Singh Sokhey, biochemist and British Indian Army general
- Sir Edwin Southern, biomedical scientist, invented Southern blot, Canada Gairdner International Award winner in 1990, Lasker Award winner in 2005
- Tara Spires-Jones, neuroscientist
- George Neil Stewart, physiologist
- Anne Bryson Sutherland, plastic surgeon
- Grant Robert Sutherland AC, human geneticist
- D'Arcy Wentworth Thompson, biologist, pioneer in Mathematical biology
- Alison J. Tierney, professor of nursing, nurse theorist
- William Aldren Turner, neurologist
- Meena Upadhyaya, medical geneticist
- Colin S. Valentine, medical missionary
- C. H. Waddington, eminent developmental biologist
- John Walker, naturalist
- Joanna Wardlaw, neuroradiology and neuroimaging
- Herbert Furnivall Waterhouse, surgeon and lecturer in anatomy
- Robert Whytt, medicine
- Robert Willan, founder of dermatology
- Sir Ian Wilmut, embryologist and former supervisor of the team that cloned Dolly the Sheep, Shaw Prize laureate in 2008
- Nairn Wilson, dental surgeon
- Samuel Alexander Kinnier Wilson, first describer of Wilson's Disease
- William Withering, physician, discoverer of Digitalis
- Asrat Woldeyes, Ethiopian surgeon and politician
- Robert Ramsay Wright, biologist, helped to re-establish the University of Toronto Faculty of Medicine in 1887
- Ruth Wynne-Davies doctor and expert on scoliosis and clubfoot
- Charles Wyville Thomson, naturalist and chief scientist on the Challenger expedition
- Yao Zhen, biologist
- Zhong Nanshan, pulmonologist, discoverer of the SARS Coronavirus and former president of the Chinese Medical Association

== Social sciences, arts and business ==
=== Pulitzer Prize ===
- Ross Anderson, winner of the Pulitzer Prize for National Reporting in 1990
- Andrew Marshall, winner of the Pulitzer Prize for International Reporting in 2014
- Jack N. Rakove, winner of the Pulitzer Prize for History in 1997
- Garry Wills, winner of the Pulitzer Prize for General Nonfiction in 1993

=== Architecture ===
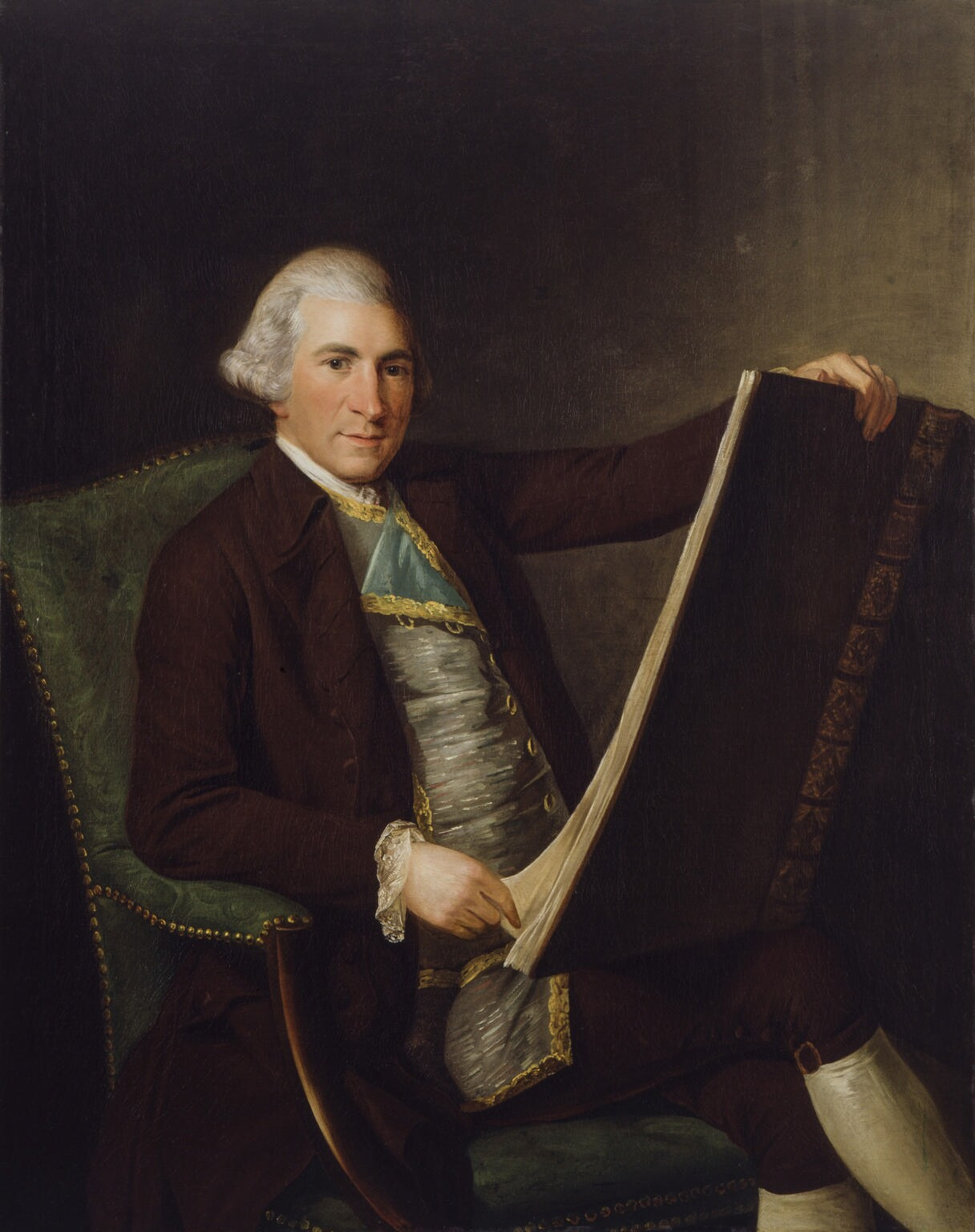
Robert Adam

- Robert Adam, architect
- Suad Amiry, Palestinian architect
- Sir Robert Rowand Anderson, architect
- Denise Bennetts, co-founder of Bennetts Associates
- Colen Campbell, architect and architectural writer
- Theodore S. Clerk, Ghanaian architect
- Ted Cullinan, architect
- Ptolemy Dean, architect, 19th and current Surveyor of the Fabric of Westminster Abbey
- Sir James Dunbar-Nasmith, conservation architect and former head of the Department of Architecture (1978–1988)
- William Nairn Forbes, architect
- Malcolm Fraser, architect
- Sir Nicholas Grimshaw, architect of Waterloo International railway station and the Eden Project, former president of the Royal Academy
- Abdur Rahman Hye, architect
- Percy Johnson-Marshall, urban designer
- Tony Kettle, architect, designer of the Falkirk Wheel
- Sir William Kininmonth, architect
- Sir Robert Lorimer, architect and furniture designer
- Kate Macintosh, architect
- Ebenezer James MacRae, architect
- Anuradha Mathur, landscape architect
- Sir Robert Matthew, architect
- John McAslan, architect of Western concourse, King's Cross station
- Richard Murphy, architect
- Patrick Nuttgens, architect and academic
- Harriet Pattison, landscape architect
- William Henry Playfair, architect
- Deborah Saunt, co-founder of Deborah Saunt David Hills Architects (DSDHA)
- Frank Worthington Simon, architect
- Sir Basil Spence, Brutalist architect
- Deyan Sudjic, architecture critic
- William Thornton, architect who designed the United States Capitol

=== Business ===
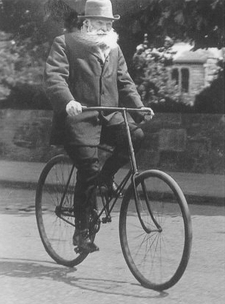
John Boyd Dunlop

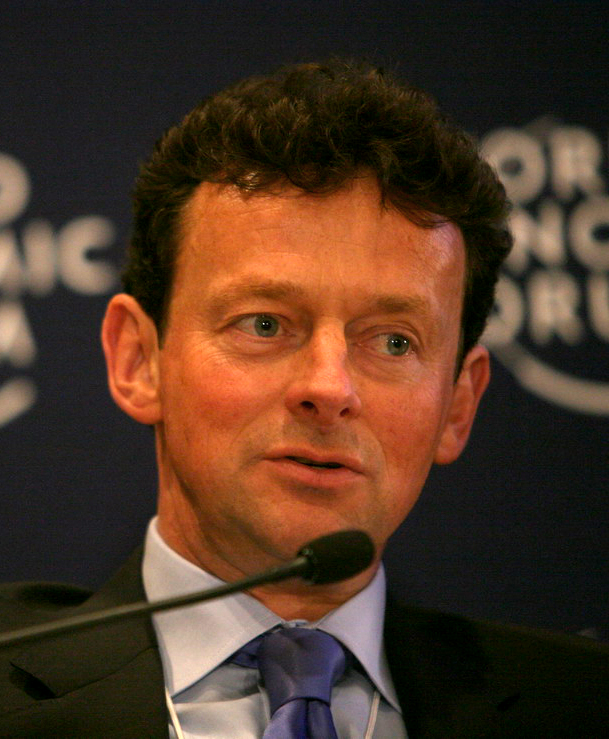
Tony Hayward

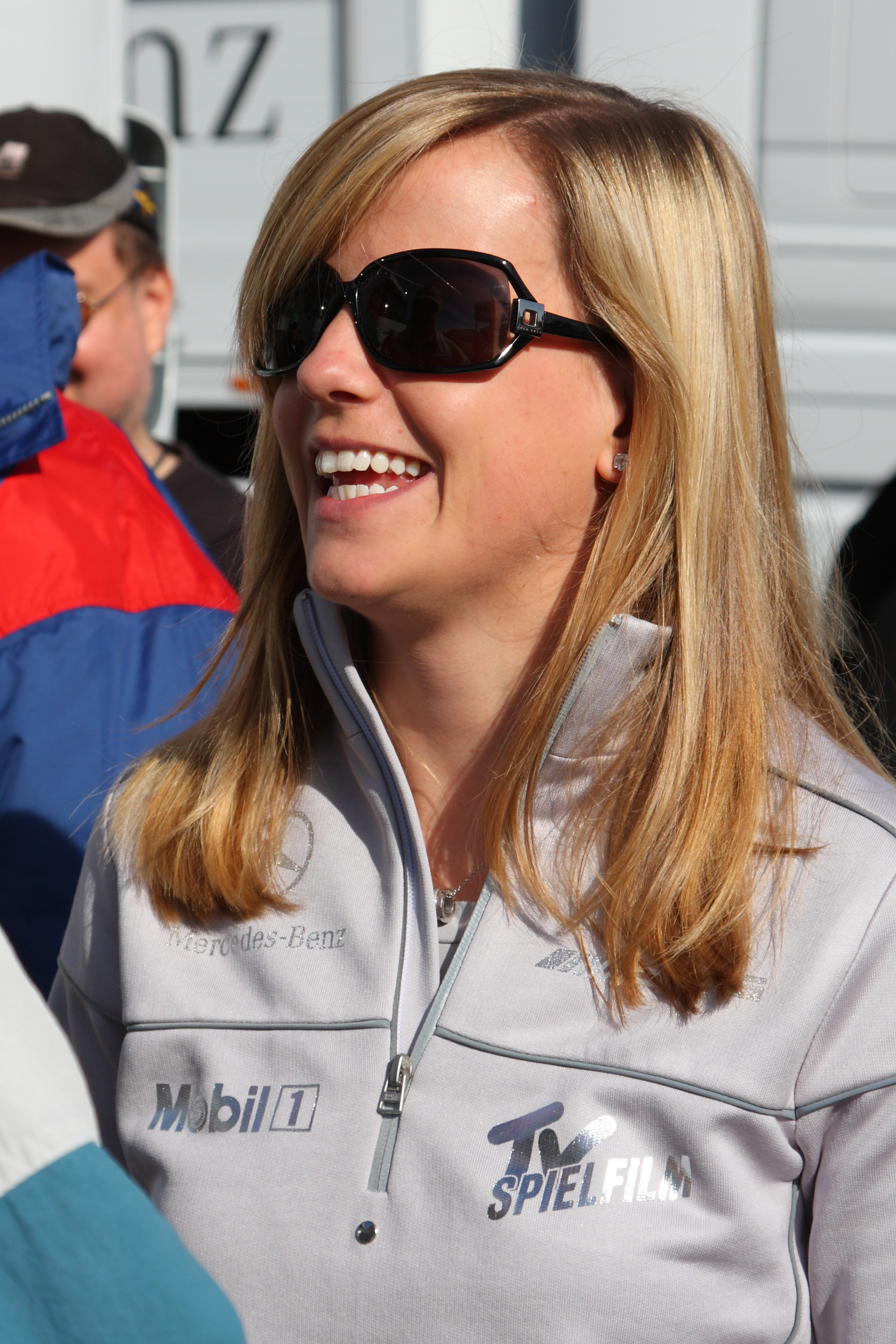
Susie Wolff

- Laura J. Alber, CEO of Williams-Sonoma Inc
- John Allan, chairman of Tesco and Barratt Developments
- Ian Bankier, chairman of Celtic F.C.
- Jo Bamford, multi-billionaire businessman, founder of investment firm HYCAP
- William Denholm Barnetson, chairman of United Newspapers, Reuters and Thames Television
- Victoria Barnsley, former CEO of HarperCollins
- Chris Beard, former CEO of Mozilla
- Crawford W. Beveridge, former executive vice president, Sun Microsystems
- Henry Birch, CEO of The Very Group
- Adam Black, founder of book publishing company A & C Black
- James Blair-Cunynghame, former chairman of the Royal Bank of Scotland
- Sir Donald Brydon, chairman of the Royal Mail, Sage Group and Medical Research Council
- Jamie Byng, CEO of Canongate Books
- Nigel Cowie, CEO of Daedong Credit Bank
- George A. David, chairman emeritus of Coca-Cola Hellenic Bottling Company
- Bob Davies, former CEO of transport company Arriva
- Martin Dickie, co-founder of BrewDog
- James Douglas, mining engineer, first president and CEO of Phelps Dodge
- John Boyd Dunlop, founder of Dunlop Tyres
- Birna Einarsdóttir, CEO of Íslandsbanki
- Nicholas Ferguson, chairman of Sky UK
- John Ritchie Findlay, owner of The Scotsman newspaper
- Stephen Fitzpatrick, founder and CEO of OVO Energy and Vertical Aerospace, former owner of the Manor Racing team
- Sandy Flockhart, former CEO of HSBC
- Robert A. Funk, former chair of the Federal Reserve Bank of Kansas City
- Carlyle Gifford, co-founder of investment firm Baillie Gifford
- Sir Alistair Grant, former governor of Bank of Scotland
- Hugh Grant, Chairman, President and CEO of Monsanto
- Doug Gurr, former global vice-president and head of Amazon UK
- Andrew Harrison, CEO of Diamond Light Source
- Rick Hayward, former chairman of Wolverhampton Wanderers F.C.
- Tony Hayward, chairman of Glencore, former CEO of BP
- Alexander S. Hoare, former CEO of private bank C. Hoare & Co
- Johnny Hornby, chairman of Sentebale
- William Jardine, merchant, surgeon, and co-founder of global conglomerate Jardine Matheson (怡和洋行)
- Sir John Jennings, former chairman of Shell
- Ian Quayle Jones, co-founder, former chairman, and CEO of Quayle Munro merchant bank
- Alan Jope, CEO of Unilever
- Jay Jopling, art dealer, founder of White Cube
- Brittany Kaiser, former business development director for Cambridge Analytica
- Vivien Kellems, American industrialist and inventor
- Robert Kibaara, CEO of Housing Finance Group of Kenya
- William Lever, 1st Viscount Leverhulme, founder of Unilever
- Eilidh Mactaggart, CEO of Scottish National Investment Bank
- Sir James Matheson, co-founder of Jardine Matheson
- Isabel Maxwell, co-founder of Excite
- John McFarlane, Chairman of Westpac, former chairman of Barclays and Aviva
- David Milne, co-founder and former CEO of Wolfson Microelectronics
- Alfred Mond, 1st Baron Melchett, founder and first CEO of Imperial Chemical Industries (ICI)
- Edoardo Mapelli Mozzi, founder and CEO of Banda Property, husband to Princess Beatrice
- Sir Kenneth Murray, founder of multinational biotechnology company Biogen
- Sir Frederick Ogilvie, former director-general of the BBC
- Lord Max Percy, financial analyst
- David E. I. Pyott, former CEO of Allergan
- Lars Rasmussen, co-founder of Google Maps
- Jim Reid, co-founder of Wolfson Microelectronics
- Anne Richards, CEO of Fidelity International
- Sir Jack Shaw, former governor of Bank of Scotland
- Nigel Stein, CEO of GKN
- Dave Stevenson, chairman of Edinburgh Woollen Mill
- Lord Swann, former chairman of the BBC
- Paul Tash, chairman and CEO of the Times Publishing Company
- David Taylor, former General Secretary of UEFA
- Xenia Timchenko, daughter of Russian billionaire Gennady Timchenko
- George Touche, co-founder of Deloitte
- Sir David Tweedie, chairman of the International Accounting Standards Board (IASB)
- James Watt, founder and CEO of BrewDog
- Andrew Wirth, president and CEO of Squaw Valley Ski Holdings
- Susie Wolff, retired racing driver and CEO of Venturi Racing
- Arthur Young, founder of Ernst & Young

=== Economics ===
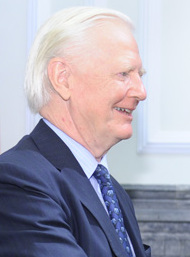
Sir James Mirrlees

- Kenneth E. Boulding, American economist, recipient of the John Bates Clark Medal in 1949
- Robin Burgess, economist
- Thomas Chalmers, political economist
- Paul Cockshott, Marxist economist
- William Cunningham, economic historian
- Marcus Fleming, known for his contribution to the Mundell–Fleming model
- Sir Alexander Gray, Scottish economist and poet
- William Ballantyne Hodgson, Scottish political economist
- Sir John Kay, British economist, first dean of Saïd Business School, University of Oxford
- Henry Dunning Macleod, coined the term "Gresham's law"
- John Ramsay McCulloch, Ricardian economist
- Sir James Mirrlees, British economist, winner of Nobel Memorial Prize in Economic Sciences in 1996
- John Moore, British economist, former president of the Econometric Society; recipient of the Yrjö Jahnsson Award in 1999, BBVA Foundation Frontiers of Knowledge Awards laureate in 2020
- Takeshi Nakano, Japanese economist and bureaucrat, introduced the Modern Monetary Theory (MMT) to Japan
- Joseph Shield Nicholson, English economist
- Ragnar Nurkse, Estonian economist, known for his balanced growth theory
- Will Page, Chief Economist at Spotify
- Sir Alan T. Peacock, English economist
- Madsen Pirie, co-founder and president of the Adam Smith Institute
- John Rae, Scottish-Canadian economist
- Gavin Clydesdale Reid, Scottish economist
- Yongcheol Shin, South Korean-born British economist
- Adam Smith, author of The Wealth of Nations, "father of economics"
- James Steuart, economist
- Jerzy Żyżyński, Polish economist

=== Literature ===
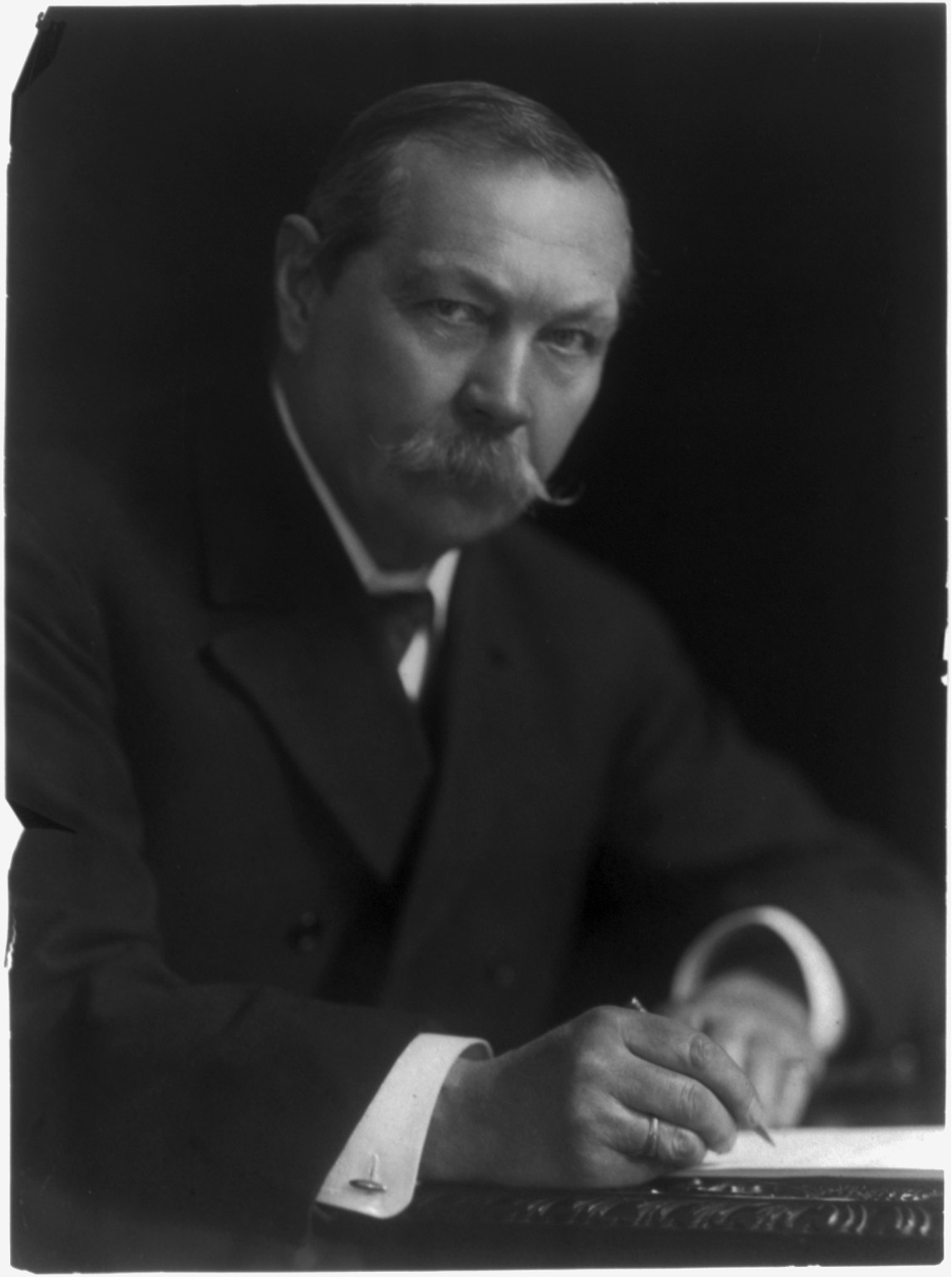
Sir Arthur Conan Doyle

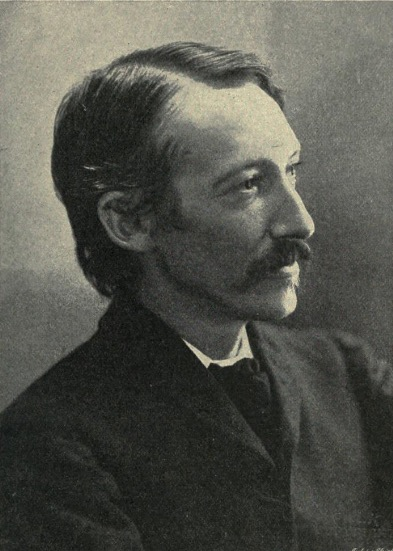
Robert Louis Stevenson

- Edward Abbey, American author
- Jokha Alharthi, novelist, 2019 winner of International Booker Prize
- William Archer, writer and critic
- John Arden, playwright
- Michael Arlen, British-Armenian essayist
- Sir J. M. Barrie, author of Peter Pan
- Horatius Bonar, Scottish churchman and poet
- James Boswell, life-long friend of Samuel Johnson, founded the modern biographic writing with his Life of Johnson
- George Mackay Brown, poet
- John Campbell, biographer
- Thomas Campbell, poet
- Thomas Carlyle, essayist and historian known for his great man theory
- Bliss Carman, Canadian poet
- George Chalmers, antiquarian and political writer
- Bruce Chatwin, travel writer, author and winner of the 1982 James Tait Black Memorial Prize
- Kate Clanchy, poet and freelance writer
- Jenny Colgan, romantic novelist
- S. R. Crockett, novelist
- Charles Cumming, spy fiction writer
- David Daiches, literary historian and critic
- Helen Dale, writer
- Erasmus Darwin, poet, writer and natural philosopher
- John Davison, poet
- Thomas Dick, writer
- Angus Donald, author and journalist
- Sir Arthur Conan Doyle, author and creator of Sherlock Holmes
- William Drummond of Hawthornden, poet
- Barbara Erskine, novelist
- Ralph Erskine, poet and churchman
- Ahmed Fagih, Libyan novelist and diplomat
- John Fowles, novelist, author of The Collector and The French Lieutenant's Woman
- Miriam Gamble, poet
- Robert Garioch, poet and translator
- Oliver Goldsmith, writer, poet, and author of The Vicar of Wakefield
- Michael Grant, writer and historian
- Philippa Gregory, historical novelist, author of The Other Boleyn Girl
- Hamish Henderson, Scottish poet
- Ella Hickson, award-winning playwright
- John Hodge, screenwriter
- Thomas Hodgskin, socialist writer
- Sam Holcroft, playwright
- John Home, playwright and joint-founder of the Royal Society of Edinburgh
- Gu Hongming, writer and polyglot
- Africanus Horton, first West African graduate of Edinburgh, nationalist writer, and medical surgeon
- Kathleen Jamie, current Makar for Scotland
- Harold Jenkins, Shakespeare scholar
- Ae-ran Kim, South Korean writer
- Lucy Kirkwood, playwright
- Paul Alfred Kleinert, German writer, editor and translator
- John Gibson Lockhart, biographer of Sir Walter Scott
- Andrew Lownie, biographer
- Christine De Luca, poet
- Norman MacCaig, Scottish poet
- Hugh MacDiarmid, Scottish poet and essayist
- Sharman Macdonald, playwright
- Ian Maclaren, fiction writer and minister of the Free Church of Scotland
- Sorley MacLean (Somhairle MacGill-Eain), Gaelic poet, nominated for the Nobel Prize for Literature in 1994
- James Macpherson, poet, collector and publisher of The Poems of Ossian
- William Matheson (1910–1995), Scottish Gaelic scholar and ordained minister of the Church of Scotland
- Joel McIver, author
- C. K. Scott Moncrieff, writer and translator
- Samuel George Morton, writer and physician, proponent of polygenism
- Flora Nwapa, Nigerian author, educator and politician
- Kole Omotosho, Nigerian writer
- Julie O'Neill, author
- Lloyd Osbourne, novelist
- Neil Paterson, Academy award-winning playwright and screenwriter
- David Paulides, writer
- Themo H. Peel, author and illustrator
- John William Polidori, personal physician to Lord Byron and author of The Vampyre, the first modern vampire story
- Kenneth Ramchand, Trinidadian author and literary scholar
- Sir Ian Rankin, author of the Inspector Rebus series and winner of the 2003 Edgar Awards
- Peter Mark Roget, author of the first thesaurus
- J. K. Rowling, author of the Harry Potter series (Note: Rowling attended the Moray House School of Education in 1995, before it merged with the university in 1998.)
- George Saintsbury, literary critic
- Sir Walter Scott, romanticist, author of Ivanhoe and Waverly, and founder of the historical novel genre
- Rachel Shabi, political author
- Ansuyah Ratipul Singh, South African author and doctor
- Samuel Smiles, author and reformer
- A. J. M. Smith, Canadian poet
- Alexander McCall Smith, author of The No. 1 Ladies' Detective Agency series and professor of medical law
- Tobias Smollett, poet and novelist
- William Soutar, poet and diarist
- Robert Louis Stevenson, author of Treasure Island and Strange Case of Dr Jekyll and Mr Hyde
- James Thomson, poet and playwright, known for the lyrics of "Rule, Britannia!"
- Catherynne M. Valente, American fiction writer, three-time Locus Award winner
- Alan Warner, novelist
- Kenneth White, poet
- Aeneas Francon Williams, writer, poet, and missionary
- John Wilson, writer

=== Media and the arts ===
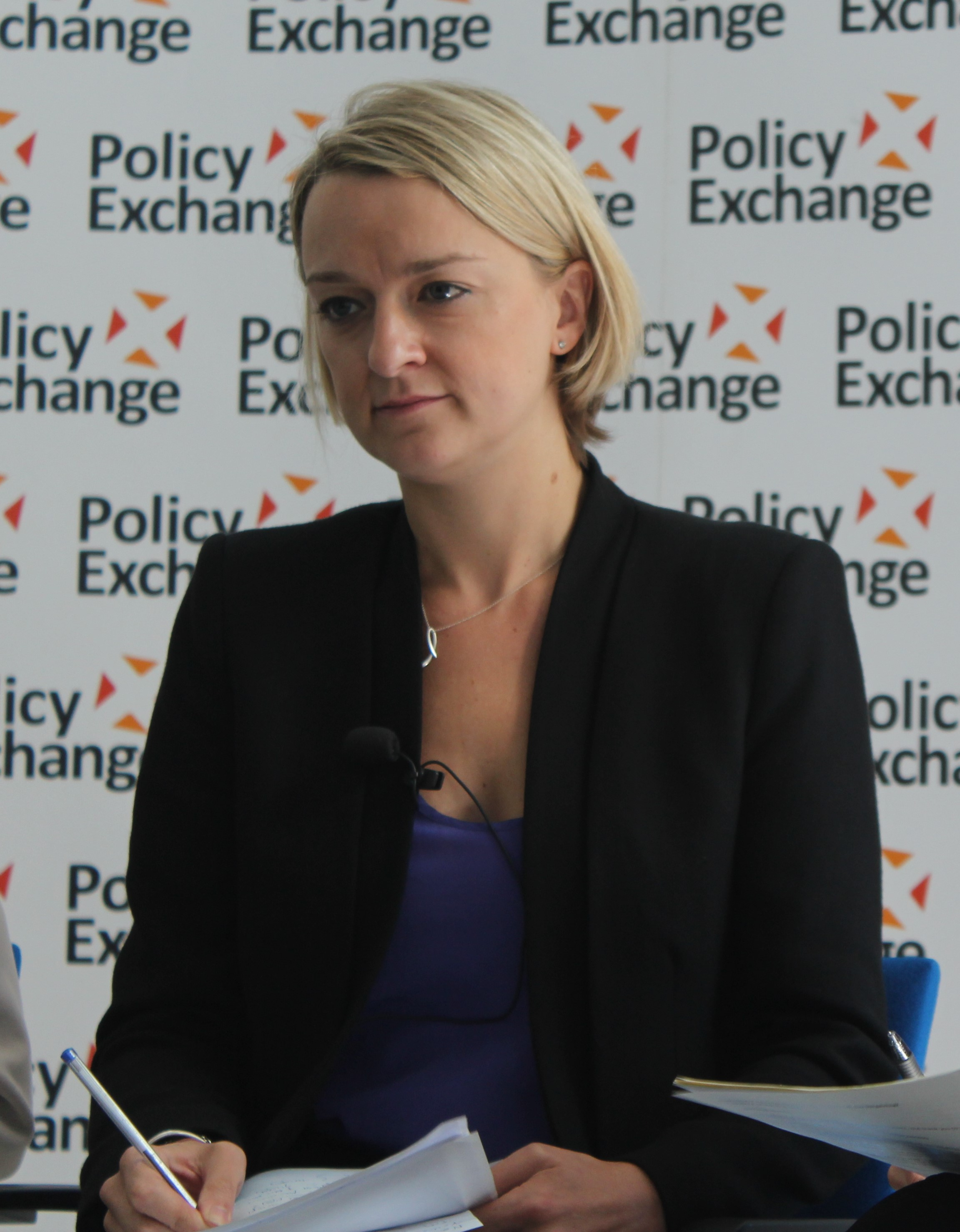
Laura Kuenssberg

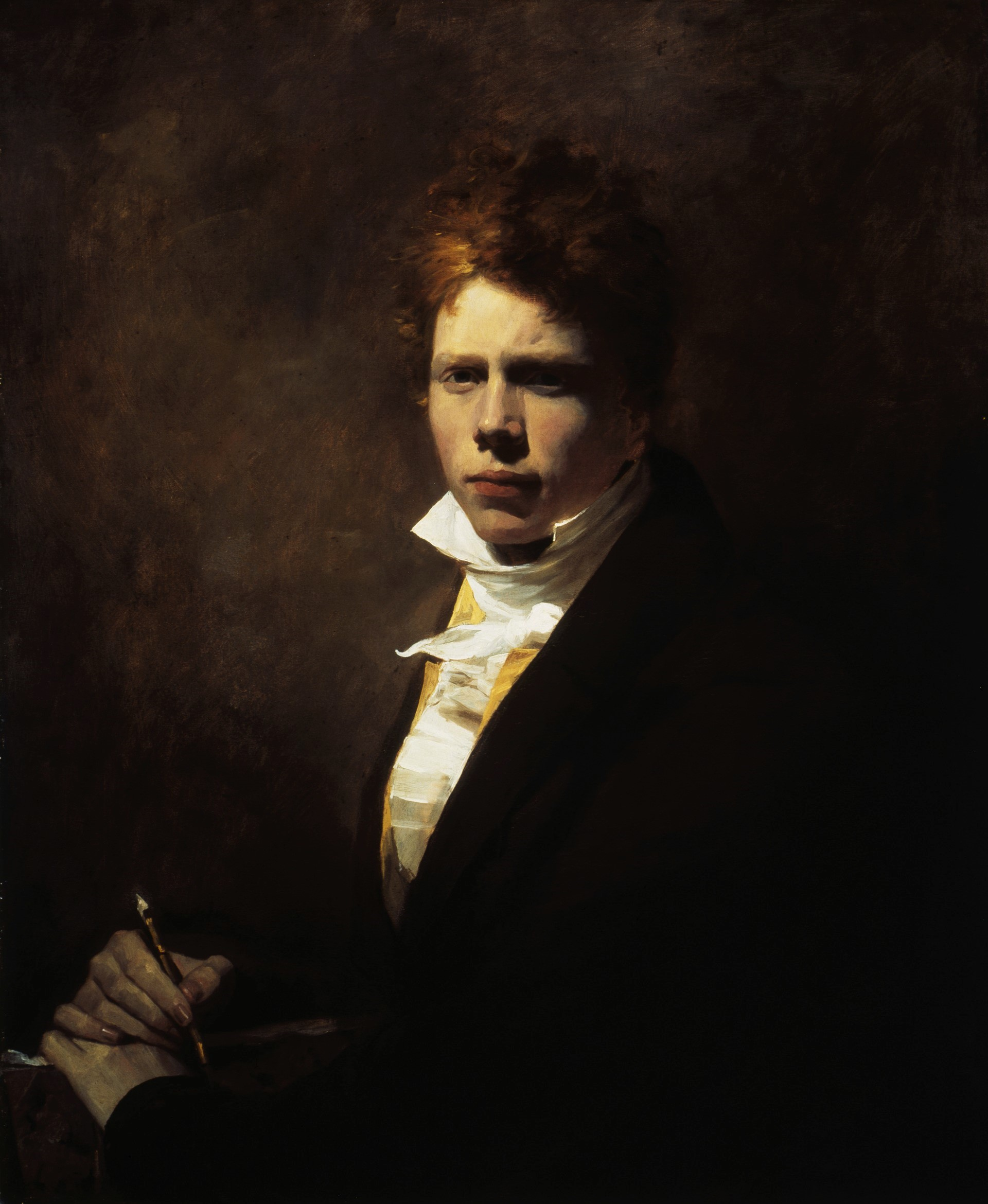
Sir David Wilkie

- Jane Alexander, two time Primetime Emmy Award winner, Tony Award winner
- Camilla Arfwedson, actress
- Richard Arnold, presenter and journalist best known for his work on GMTV
- Maria Bamford, comedian
- Mardi Barrie, artist
- Mitch Benn, comedian, songwriter and broadcaster
- Elizabeth Blackadder, artist
- Phyllis Bone, sculptor
- Michael Boyd, artistic director of the Royal Shakespeare Company
- Tom Bradby, journalist and novelist
- JJ Chalmers, former Marine and television presenter
- Ian Charleson, actor
- Rawdon Christie, Television New Zealand producer/presenter
- Hamish Clark, actor
- Robbie Coltrane, actor, as Rubeus Hagrid in Harry Potter
- Sophie Cookson, actress
- Quentin Cooper, science journalist and broadcaster
- Michael Davies, executive producer of Jeopardy!
- Anthony d'Offay, art dealer
- Daisy Donovan, actor and broadcaster
- Rona Dougall, broadcaster, journalist and presenter (Scotland Tonight)
- Elize du Toit, actress
- Jimmy Finlayson, actor and comedian
- Iain Gale, journalist and author
- Jessica Harrison-Hall, British Museum curator
- Jim Haynes, founder of Traverse Theatre, the paper International Times and the London Arts Lab
- Mairi Hedderwick, illustrator and author
- Carl Honoré, Canadian journalist
- Robert Indiana, pop artist
- Miles Jupp, comedian
- Alex Kay-Jelski, journalist, editor of The Athletic
- Roisin Kennedy, art critic and curator
- Humphrey Ker, actor and comedian
- Laura Kuenssberg, editor, BBC Politics
- Paul Laidlaw, auctioneer and television antiques expert
- Katie Leung, actress, as Cho Chang in Harry Potter
- Allan Little, BBC Foreign Correspondent
- Donald Locke, Guyanese artist and curator
- Angus Macfadyen, actor, Robert the Bruce in Braveheart
- Ewen MacIntosh, actor, The Office, Little Britain
- Sally Magnusson, journalist, broadcaster on BBC Scotland
- Patrick Malahide, actor
- Sam McAlister, TV producer and author
- Freddy McConnell, Guardian multimedia journalist
- Michael McIntyre, comedian
- Gillian McKeith, television presenter and writer
- Kevin McKidd, actor, as Owen Hunt in Grey's Anatomy
- Hilton McRae, actor
- William Cameron Menzies, film director and production designer, winner of Academy Award for Best Production Design and Academy Honorary Award
- Judith Miller, antiques expert, writer and broadcaster
- Steve Morrison, TV producer and former Rector of the University
- Marina O'Loughlin, restaurant critic
- Sir Eduardo Paolozzi, sculptor and pioneer in pop art
- Peter Pomerantsev, Soviet-born British journalist
- Catherine Rayner, illustrator and author
- David Rintoul, actor
- Varalaxmi Sarathkumar, actress
- Alastair Sim, actor
- Iain Stirling, comedian
- Rachael Stirling, actress
- Ed Stoppard, actor
- Margaret Tait, filmmaker and poet
- Bill Turnbull, journalist and television presenter
- Kirsty Wark, broadcaster
- Greg Wise, actor, as John Willoughby in Sense and Sensibility
- Sir David Wilkie, painter

=== Music ===
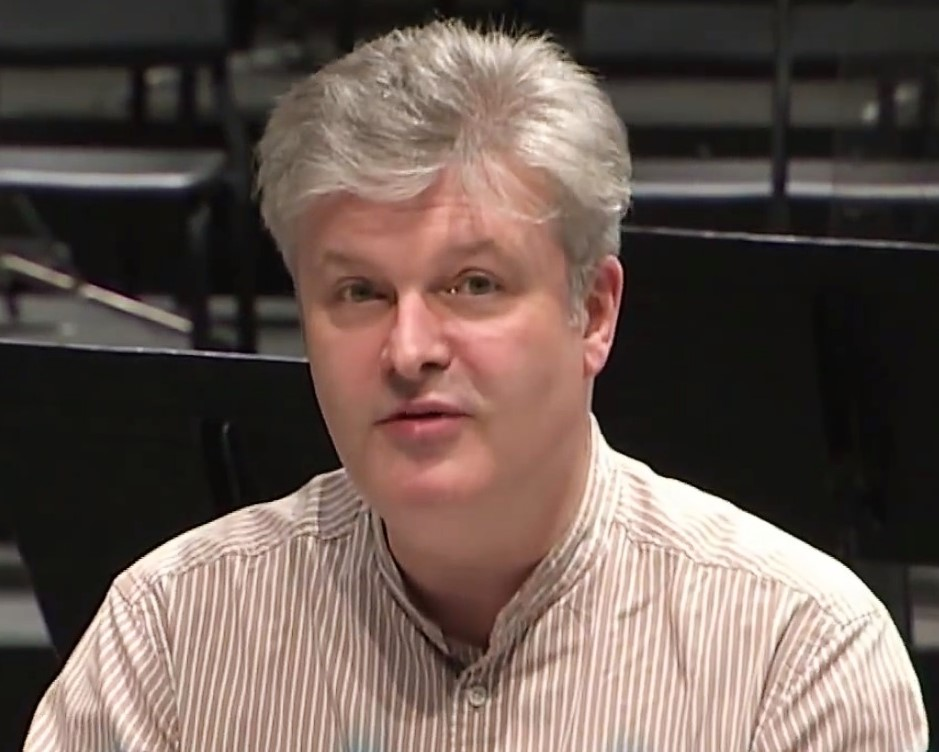
Sir James MacMillan

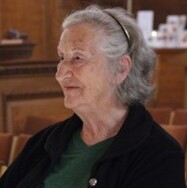
Thea Musgrave

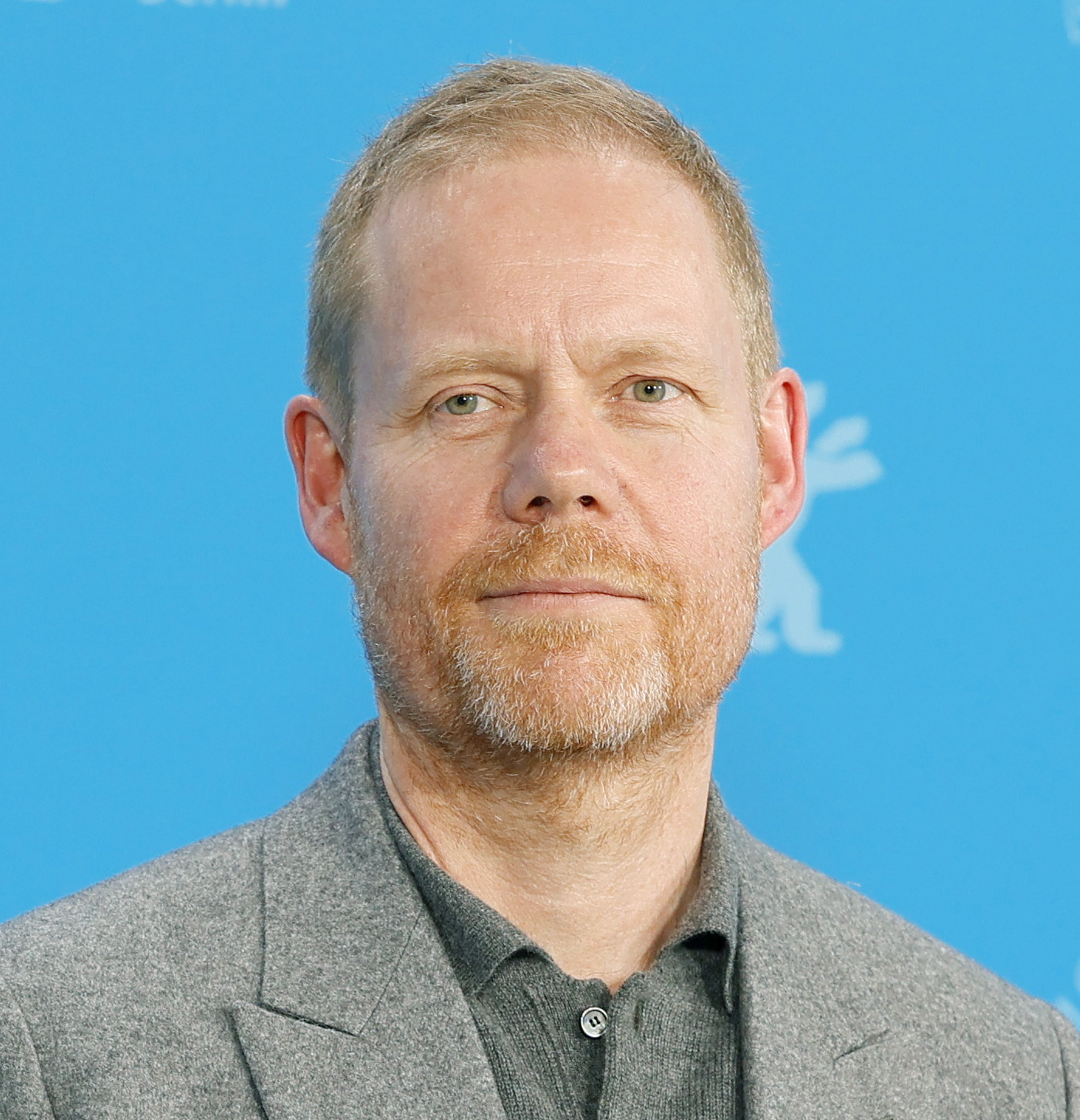
Max Richter

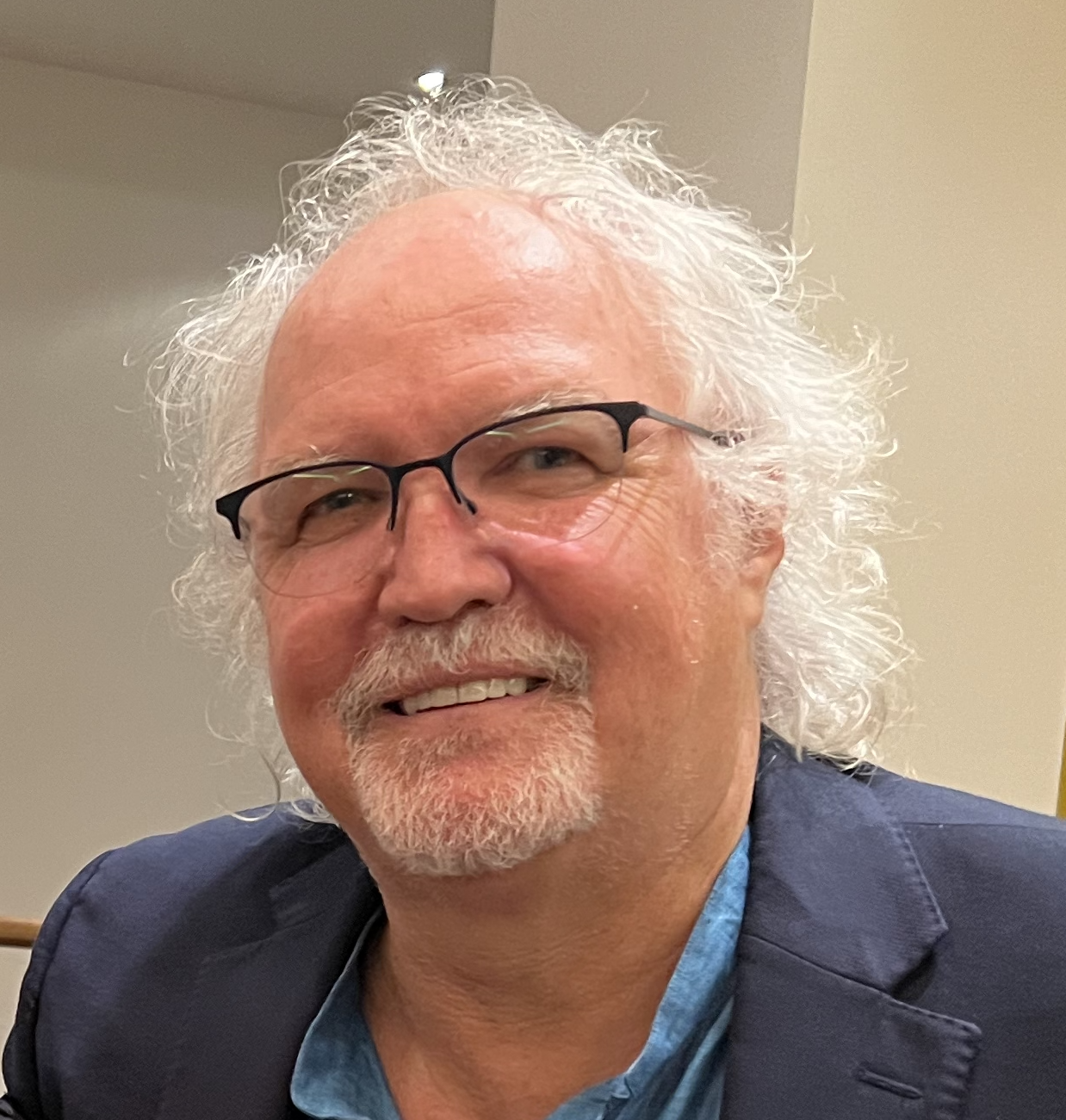
Sir Donald Runnicles

- Sir Henry Bishop, composer
- Sir Adrian Boult, conductor
- Tom Chaplin, lead singer of Keane
- Erik Chisholm, composer
- Anna Clyne, composer
- Darius Danesh, musician and singer
- Django Django, art rock band
- James Douglas, composer
- Tanya Ekanayaka, composer-pianist
- Hans Gal, composer
- Katie Gregson-MacLeod, musician
- Marjory Kennedy-Fraser, singer and composer
- Kenneth Leighton, composer
- Sir Alexander Mackenzie, composer
- Sir James MacMillan, classical composer
- Stuart MacRae, composer
- Eduardo Reck Miranda, composer and Professor of Computer Music
- Marcus Mumford, lead singer of Mumford & Sons
- Thea Musgrave, composer
- Mylo, DJ
- Sir Herbert Oakeley, composer
- Carl Orff, German composer
- Nigel Osborne, composer
- The Rezillos, punk/new wave band
- Max Richter, composer and pianist
- Sir Donald Runnicles, conductor
- Rebecca Saunders, composer
- Mike Scott, founder of The Waterboys
- Dan Tepfer, jazz pianist and composer
- John Thomson, composer
- Sir Donald Francis Tovey, composer, pianist, musicologist
- Julian Wagstaff, composer
- David Wilde, pianist and composer
- Derek Williams, composer, arranger and conductor
- William Wordsworth, composer

=== History, philosophy, anthropology, sociology and theology ===
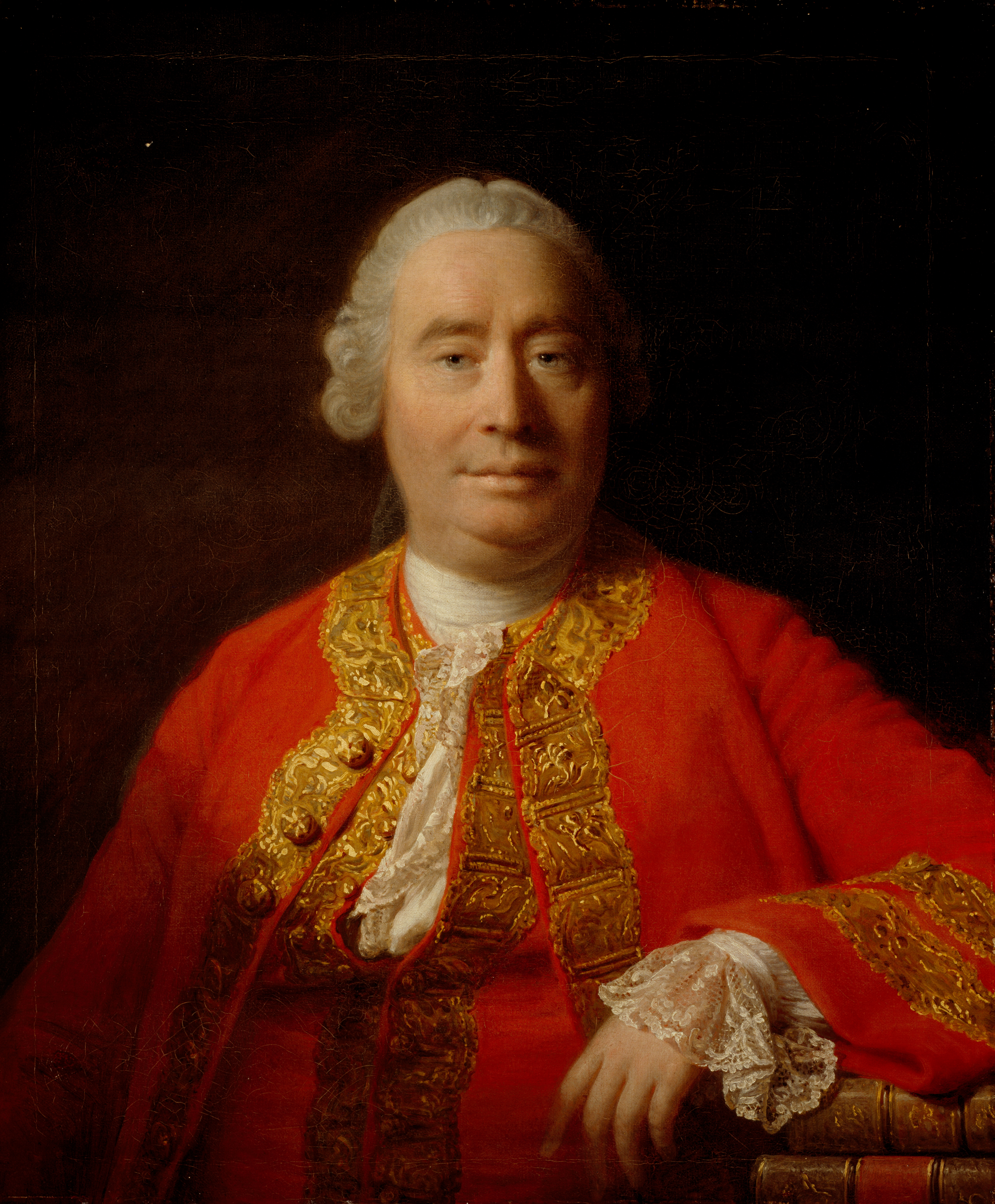
David Hume

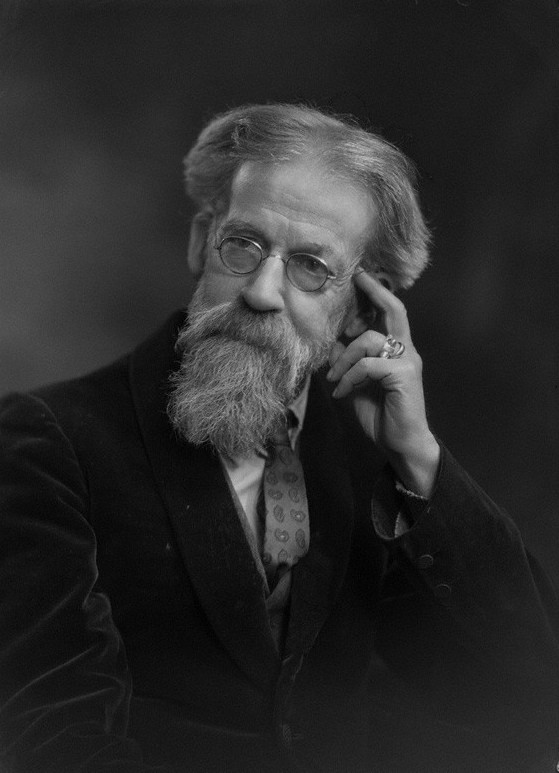
Sir Patrick Geddes

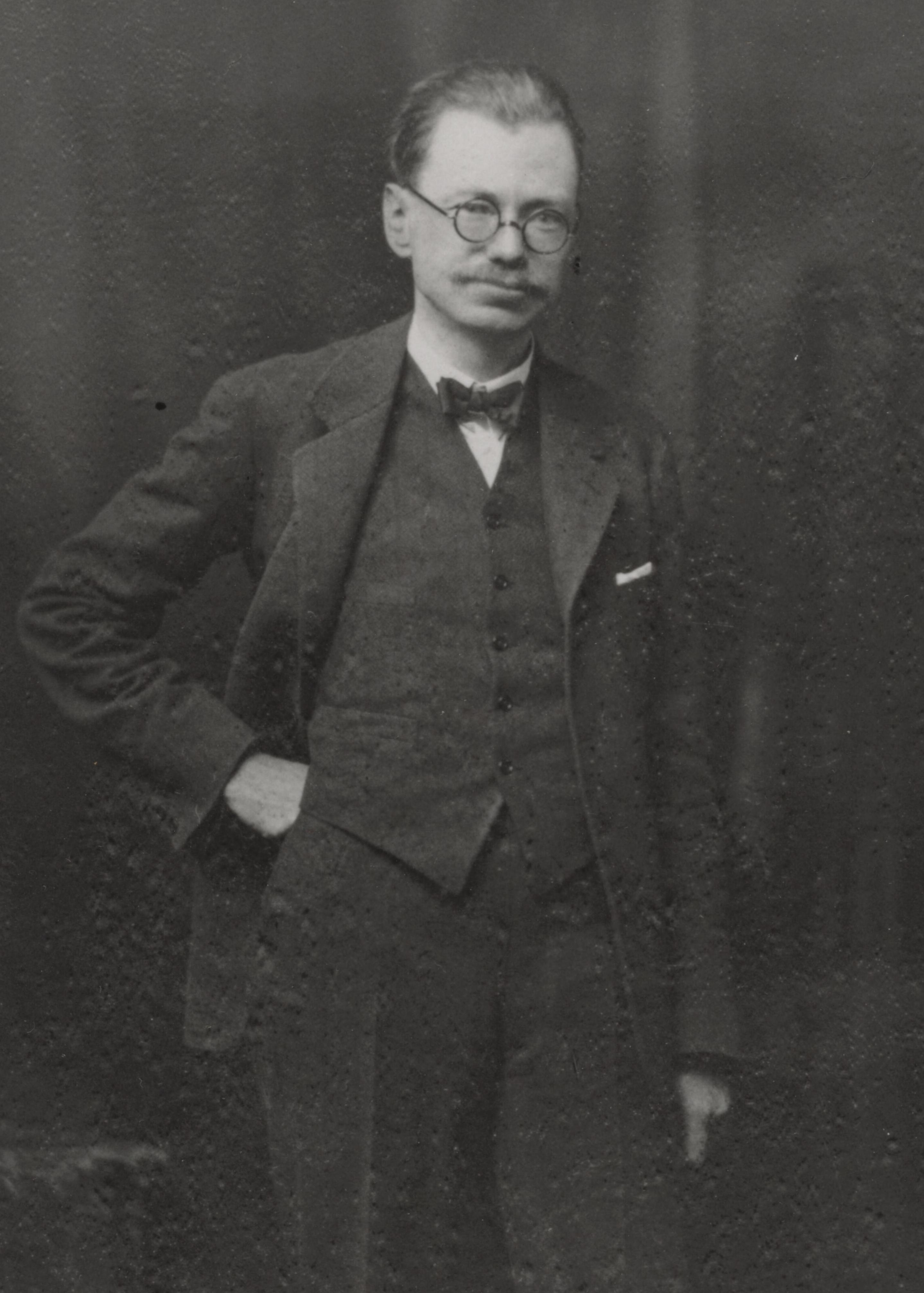
V. Gordon Childe

- Marcella Althaus-Reid, theologian
- John Anderson, philosopher
- Talal Asad, anthropologist
- John Baillie, theologian
- Robert Bartlett, medievalist, winner of the Wolfson History Prize in 1993
- Jay Bernstein, philosopher
- Alexander Bird, philosopher
- Helen Bond, theologian
- Clifford Edmund Bosworth, historian and Orientalist specialising in Arabic and Iranian studies
- Sarah Broadie, philosopher
- Irene Brown, linguist and codebreaker who worked at Bletchley Park
- Thomas Brown, medicine and philosophy
- John Burnet, classicist
- James Burnett, Lord Monboddo, naturalist, philosopher, linguist
- Tom Burns, sociologist
- Oswald Chambers, Baptist evangelist
- V. Gordon Childe, eminent archeologist
- Andy Clark, philosopher of mind and cognition
- Peter Comensoli, current Archbishop of Melbourne
- Benjamin Constant, French député and political thinker
- Pit Corder, linguist
- Henry Widdowson, linguist
- Saul David, military historian
- Christopher Dawson, Catholic historian
- Tom Devine, historian specialized in Scottish history
- Ligon Duncan, theologian
- John Erickson, military historian
- Adam Ferguson, philosopher and historian, contributed to the initial development of sociology
- David Fergusson, theologian
- Kit Fine, philosopher
- George Finlay, historian
- Sir Patrick Geddes, sociologist, developed the concept of Conurbation
- Ernest Gellner, philosopher, critical rationalist
- H. A. R. Gibb, orientalist
- John Gilchrist, linguist
- James Giles (born 1958), philosopher and psychologist
- Michael Grant, classicist
- Michael Halliday, linguist, founder of Systemic functional linguistics
- Sir William Hamilton, 9th Baronet, philosopher and logician
- Thomas Blom Hansen, anthropologist
- Alexander Henderson, second founder of Reformed Church in Scotland
- John Hick, religious philosopher
- John Holloway, sociologist and Marxist philosopher
- David Hume, philosopher and historian
- Larry Hurtado, New Testament scholar
- Michael Ingham, Anglican bishop and author
- Edward Irving, founder of the Catholic Apostolic Church
- Alison Jaggar, feminist philosopher
- Schuyler Jones, anthropologist
- Martin Joos, linguist
- Margot Käßmann, theologian, former leader of Evangelical Church in Germany
- Norman Kemp Smith, philosopher
- Peter Ladefoged, linguist and phonetician
- Rae Langton, philosopher
- Alice Loxton, popular historian
- Michael Lynch, expert on Scottish Reformation
- Sir John Lyons, linguist
- Sir Neil MacCormick, former MEP and legal philosopher
- Neil MacGregor, art historian, former director of the National Gallery, London (1987–2002) and of the British Museum (2002–2015), founding director of the Humboldt Forum (2015–)
- Robert Morrison MacIver, sociologist
- Ruth Barcan Marcus, philosopher and logician
- Arthur Marwick, historian
- Elton Mayo, psychologist and organizational theorist
- Robert Murray M'Cheyne, church minister
- James Mill, historian, classical economist and utilitarian philosopher
- Peter Millican, philosopher
- Akbar Muhammad, historian specialized in African history
- Donald Nicol, Byzantinist
- David Nicolle, military historian
- Pippa Norris, political scientist
- Christine Nuttall, linguistics and teaching English as a foreign language
- Cardinal Keith O'Brien, former Archbishop of Saint Andrews and Edinburgh
- Richard Ovenden, Bodley's Librarian in the University of Oxford
- Thorsten J. Pattberg, philologist and cultural critic
- Stuart Piggott, archeologist
- Huw Price, philosopher
- Duncan Pritchard, philosopher
- Geoffrey K. Pullum, linguist
- Sir Herbert Read, art historian, poet, literary critic and philosopher
- Rush Rhees, philosopher
- David Talbot Rice, art historian who gave his name to the Talbot Rice Gallery at Edinburgh
- David George Ritchie, philosopher
- William Robertson, Historiographer Royal and Principal of the University of Edinburgh
- William Robertson Smith, orientalist and church minister
- Holmes Rolston III, philosopher, winner of the Templeton Prize in 2003
- Sir W. D. Ross, Aristotelian philosopher
- Samuel Seabury, first American Episcopal bishop
- Timothy Sprigge, philosopher
- Dugald Stewart, enlightenment philosopher
- John Toland, philosopher, coined the term "pantheism"
- Iain Torrance, theologian and President of Princeton Theological Seminary
- Thomas F. Torrance, theologian, winner of the Templeton Prize in 1978
- Immanuel Velikovsky, psychoanalyst
- Géza Vermes, historian and theologian
- Tullio Vinay, founder of Agapè Center, Righteous Among the Nations
- Asher Wade, American-born international lecturer and psychotherapist
- Jeremy Waldron, legal philosopher
- William J. Watson, linguist and toponymist, scholar of the history of Scottish place names
- W. Montgomery Watt, historian and Orientalist
- Heather Widdows, philosopher
- Timothy Williamson, philosopher
- Alexander Fraser Tytler, Lord Woodhouselee, historian and political theorist
- Alex Woolf, medieval historian
- Michael Worton, former vice provost of University College of London
- Yang Changji, Chinese educator and philosopher, mentor and godfather of Mao Zedong
- George Yule, linguist
- Zhu Guangqian, philosopher on aesthetics
- John Zizioulas, Greek Orthodox prelate

=== Members of the Science Studies Unit (Edinburgh School) ===
- S. Barry Barnes, philosopher and sociologist of science
- David Bloor, philosopher, sociologist of science, and key figure in the Edinburgh school
- Martin Kusch, philosopher of science
- Steven Shapin, sociologist and philosopher of science, early founder on Sociology of scientific knowledge (STS)
- Robin Williams, developer of the concept of social shaping of technology (SST)
- Donald MacKenzie, sociologist

=== Others ===
- Lulwah Al-Qatami, Nobel Peace Prize nominee and first woman from Kuwait to attend university overseas
- B. T. S. Atkins, lexicographer
- Chris Atton, university professor and musician
- Susan Deacon, former Health Minister in the Scottish Executive, now Professor of Social Change at Queen Margaret University
- Margaret Jarvie, counsellor
- Edward Johnston, father of modern calligraphy, creator of sans-serif
- Alan M. Leslie, psychologist
- David MacRitchie, archaeologist
- Roger Mercer, archaeologist
- A.S. Neill, educationalist, founder of Summerhill School
- Madsen Pirie, founder and president of the Adam Smith Institute

== Sports ==
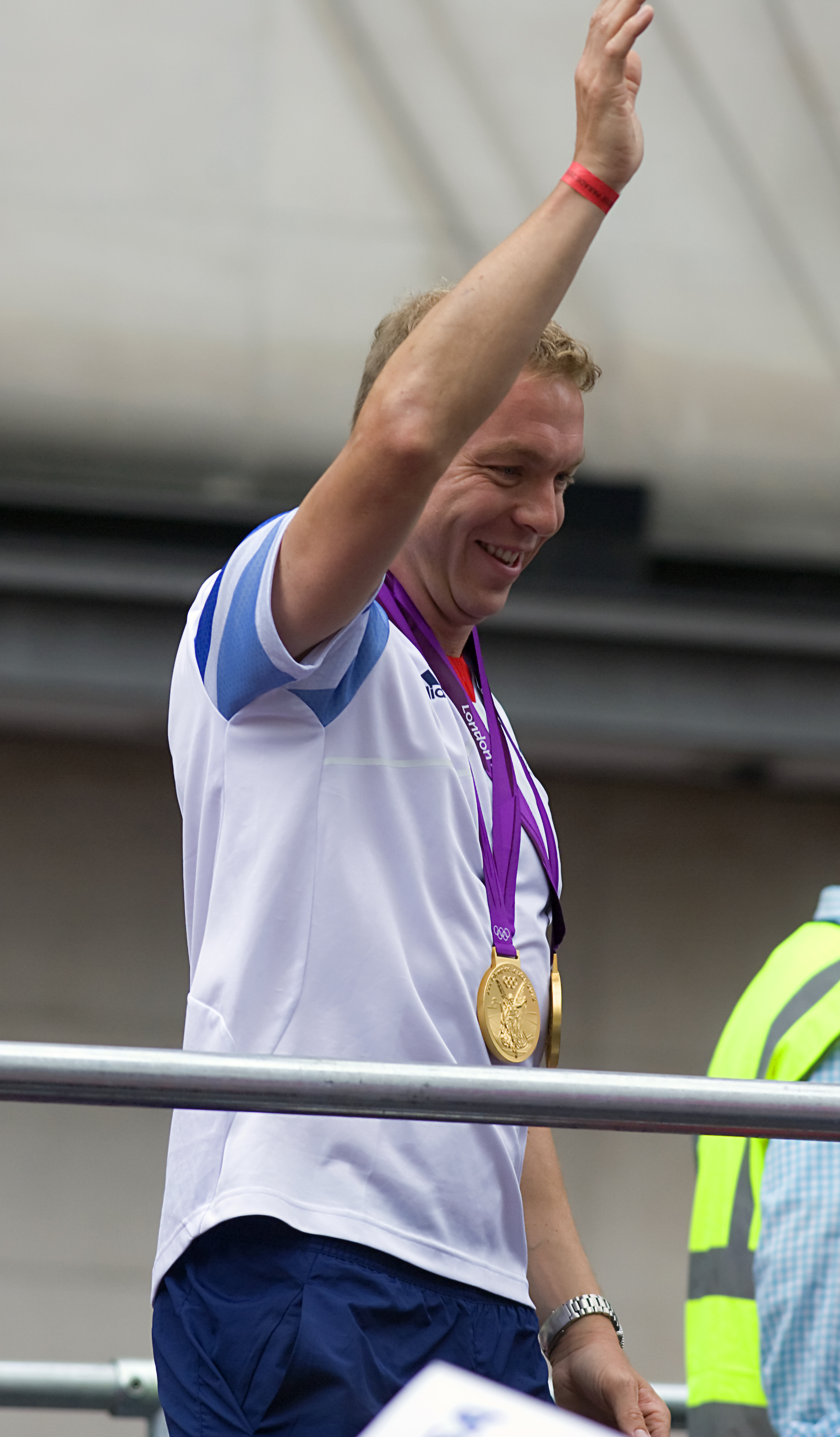
Sir Chris Hoy

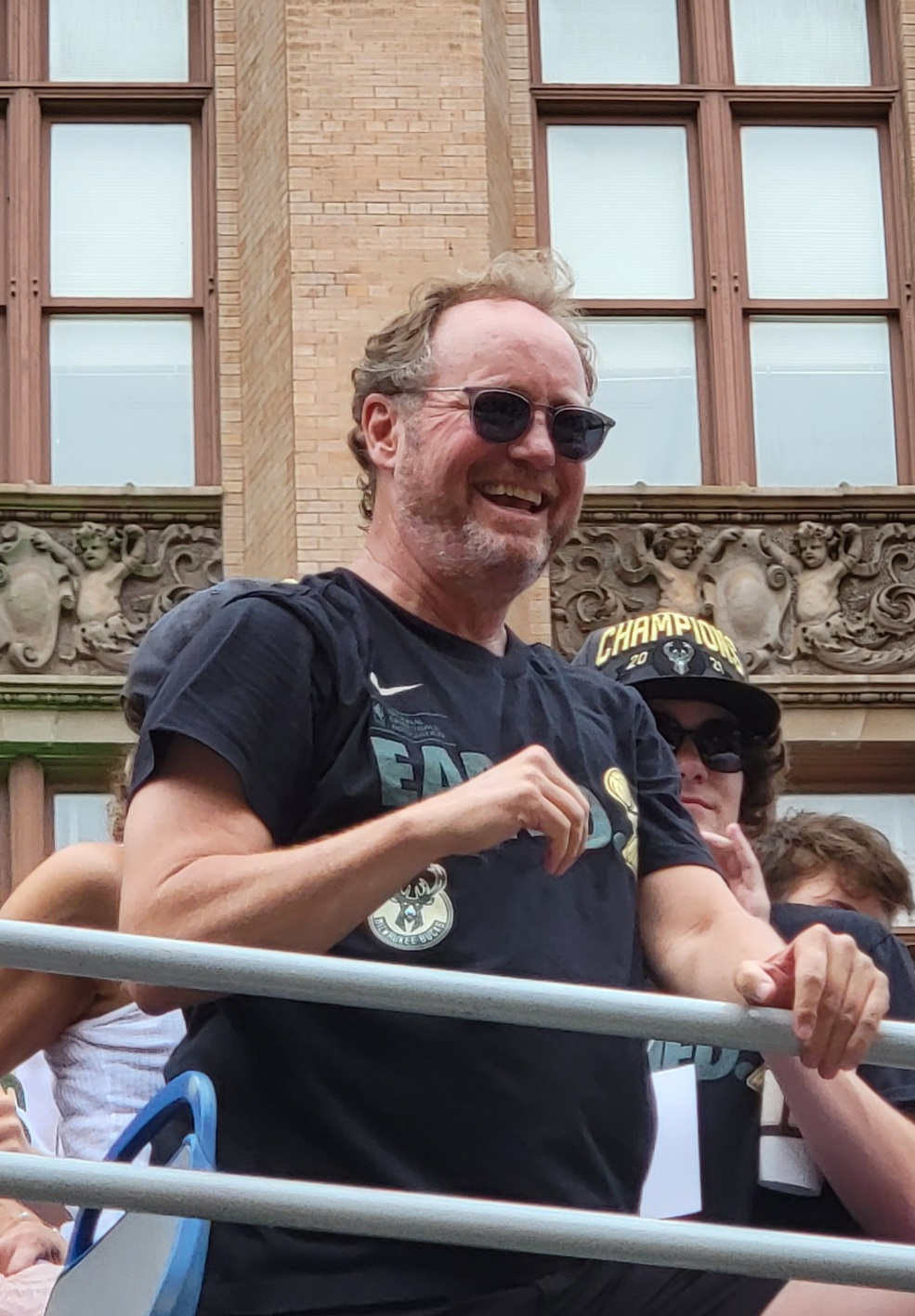
Mike Budenholzer

- Tommy Armour, three-time major golf championships winner
- Leslie Balfour-Melville, outstanding all-round sportsman
- Graeme Beveridge, Scottish international rugby union player
- Bob Braithwaite, Olympic gold medalist in Trap shooting
- Mike Budenholzer, head coach of the Phoenix Suns of the NBA
- Euan Burton, judoka
- Nikki Cross, WWE wrestler
- Zbigniew Czajkowski, fencing master, "father of the Polish School" of fencing
- Stephen Dick, hockey player
- Eilidh Doyle, Olympic track and field bronze medalist
- Gemma Gibbons, Olympic judo silver medallist
- Eilidh Gibson, canoeist
- Katherine Grainger, Olympic rowing gold medallist
- Stuart Grimes, international professional rugby union player
- Peter Heatly, diver and former chairman of the Commonwealth Games Federation
- Sir Chris Hoy, second-most successful British Olympian in history with six Olympic track cycling gold medals
- Alexander Watson Hutton, "father of Argentine football"
- Andy Irvine, rugby union player and president of the Scottish Rugby Union
- Michael Jamieson, 200m breaststroke Olympic silver medallist
- Eric Liddell, men's Olympic 400m gold medallist, and Scottish Rugby international
- Linsey MacDonald, Olympic bronze medalist in 400 metres
- Margaret Maughan, Britain's first and four-times Paralympic games gold medalist
- Caitlin McClatchey, swimmer and two-times Commonwealth gold medallist
- Judy Murray, mother and coach of professional tennis players Jamie Murray and Sir Andy Murray
- Chris Paterson, Scottish international rugby union player
- Alistair Potts, Commonwealth and British World Champion rower
- Mark Robertson, Scottish international rugby union player
- Jackie Robinson, 1948 Olympic gold medalist in Basketball representing Team USA
- Martin Sinclair, silver medalist in the 2006 Melbourne Commonwealth Games
- Pat Spence, two-time tennis Grand Slam mixed doubles champion
- Micky Steele-Bodger, English rugby international and chairman of IRB
- Robert Strang, English cricketer who played once for Scotland
- Polly Swann, Olympic rowing silver medallist
- Catherine Taylor, Jon Duncan, Scott Fraser and Yvette Baker, orienteers with international success
- Simon Taylor, international professional rugby union player
- Bungy Watson, English rugby union player
- Susie Wolff, former professional racing driver and managing director of F1 Academy

== Miscellaneous ==
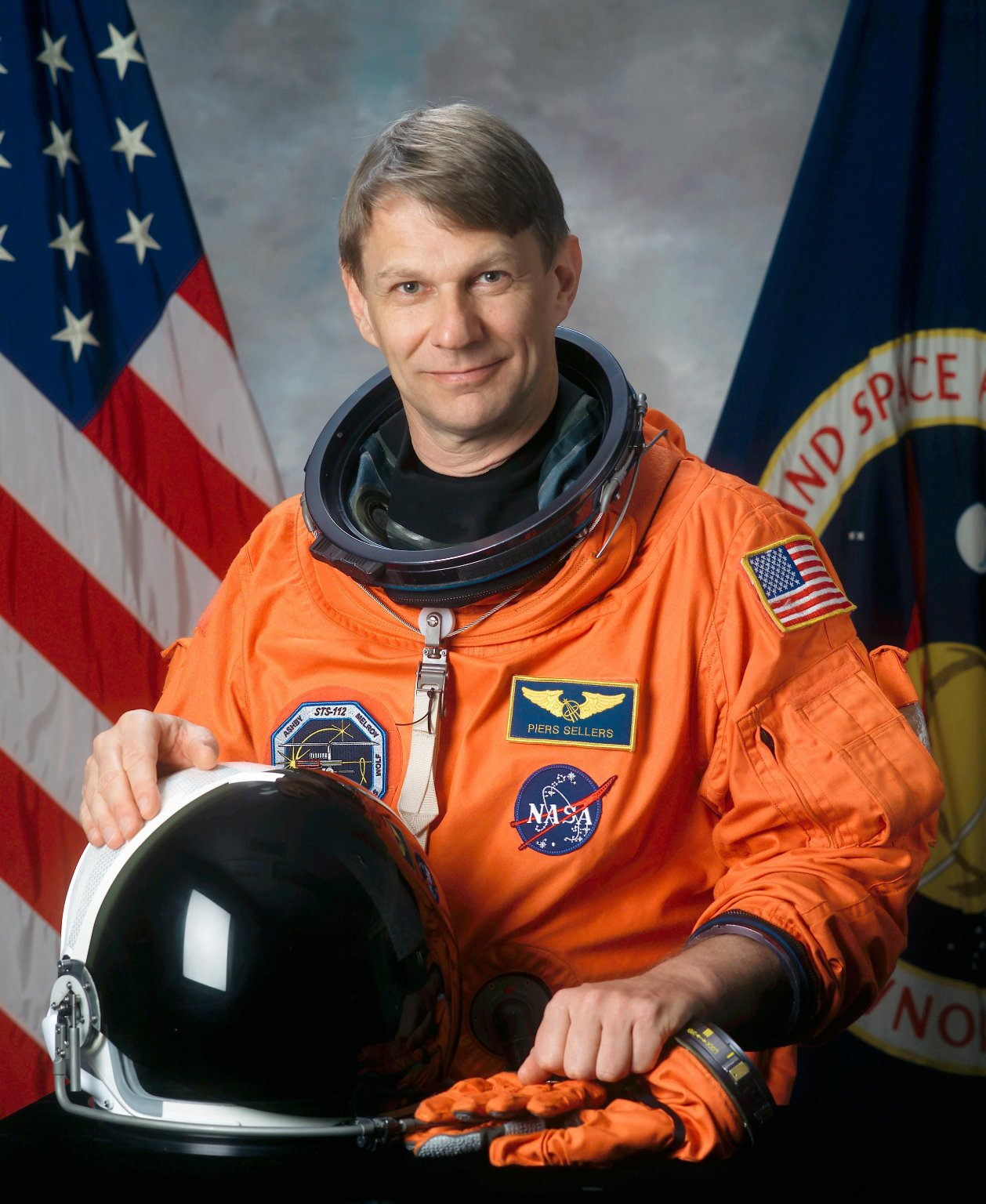
Piers Sellers

- Ruth Adler, human rights campaigner
- John Aikin, physician and writer
- John (Ian) Bartholomew, cartographer and former principal of John Bartholomew and Son Ltd.
- Thomas Spencer Baynes, publisher and writer
- Zulfikar Ali Bhutto Jr., visual artist and member of the Bhutto family
- Bakhtawar Bhutto Zardari, daughter of Benazir Bhutto, 11th and 13th prime minister of Pakistan, member of the Bhutto family
- John Biggar, Scottish mountaineer who has made various first ascents in the Andes
- George Birkbeck, founder of Birkbeck College, University of London and co-founder of UCL
- Lizelle Bisschoff, founder of the Africa in Motion (AiM) film festival in Scotland
- James Blair, founder of the College of William & Mary
- John Brown, physician and author
- Archibald Cameron of Locheil, jacobite
- Sam Denby, YouTuber
- John Dalgleish Donaldson, mathematician, father of Queen Mary of Denmark
- Robert Felkin, medical missionary; ceremonial magician, member of the Hermetic Order of the Golden Dawn; author on Africa; explorer and anthropologist
- James Gall, clergyman and astronomer, founder of the Carrubbers Close Mission
- Alastair Humphreys, Adventurer
- Rev Bruce Kenrick, writer, minister, social activist and founder of Shelter
- Rev Joseph Marsh, founder of Hill Street Academy
- Philippa Matthews, socialite and younger sister of Catherine, Princess of Wales
- Ailsa Maxwell, Bletchley Park code breaker and historian
- Sheila McKechnie, Scottish trade unionist and 1991 Alumnus of the Year
- James Middleton, businessman and younger brother of Catherine, Princess of Wales
- Macvey Napier, encyclopedist
- Mungo Park, explorer
- Lyon Playfair, 1st Baron Playfair, scientist and parliamentarian
- Daphne Pochin Mould, photographer, writer, geologist
- Stella Rimington, former head of MI5
- Peter Sawkins, winner of The Great British Bake Off 2020
- Piers Sellers, astronaut
- William Smellie, encyclopedist

== University officials and faculty ==
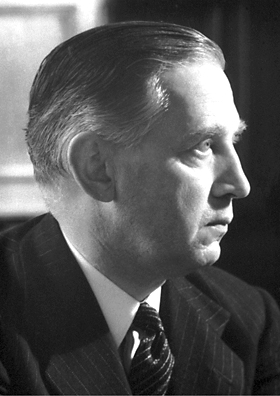
Sir Edward Appleton, Nobel laureate in Physics in 1947 for his discoveries of the ionosphere, was principal from 1949 to 1965.

- Edmund Allenby, 1st Viscount Allenby, former rector of the university (1935–1936)
- Anne, Princess Royal, chancellor of the university (2011–present)
- Sir Edward Victor Appleton, former principal and vice-chancellor of the university (1949–1965)
- Stanley Baldwin, former rector of the university (1923–1926)
- Arthur Balfour, former chancellor of the university (1891–1930)
- Earl Beatty, former rector of the university (1917–1920)
- Gordon Brown, former rector of the university (1972–1975)
- Sir Winston Churchill, former rector of the university (1929–1932)
- Viscount Cunningham of Hyndhope, rector of the university (1945–1948)
- Sir Alexander Fleming, former rector of the university (1951–1953)
- David Lloyd George, former rector of the university (1920–1923)
- William Gladstone, former rector of the university (1859–1865)
- Prince Philip, Duke of Edinburgh, former chancellor of the university (1953–2010)
- The Earl of Rosebery, former rector of the university (1880–1883)

=== Faculty ===
Colin Kingsley, lecturer on music

== See also ==
- List of Nobel laureates affiliated with the University of Edinburgh
