= School of Informatics, University of Edinburgh =

Higher education institution

Coordinates: 55°56′40″N 3°11′14″W

School of Informatics
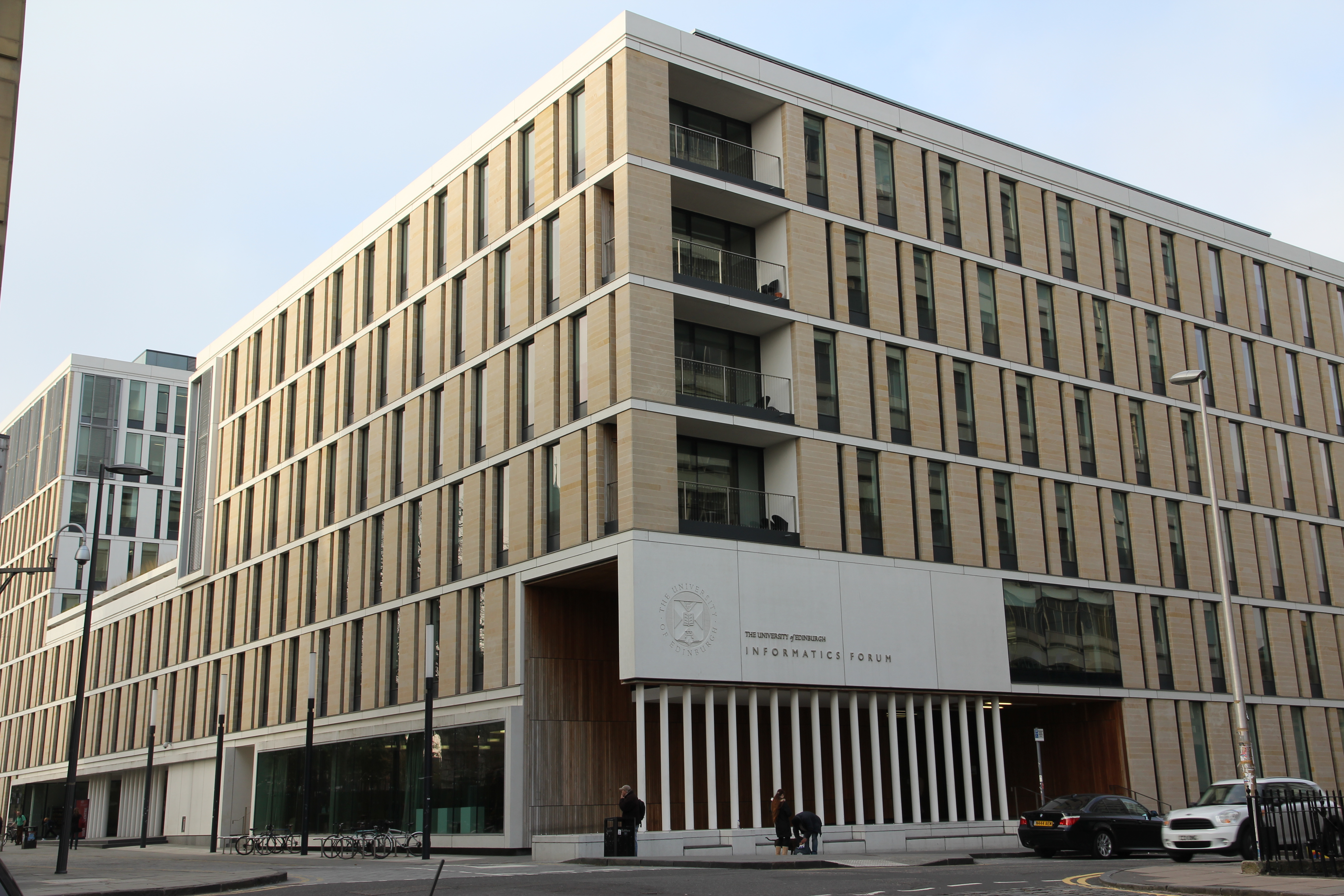
- The Informatics Forum, home to the School of Informatics since 2008
- Established: 1998
- Parent institution: University of Edinburgh College of Science and Engineering
- Head of School: Helen Hastie
- Academic staff: 370
- Administrative staff: 96
- Students: 1717
- Undergraduates: 1020
- Postgraduates: 697
- Location: Edinburgh, Scotland, UK
- Website: www.ed.ac.uk/informatics

The School of Informatics is an academic department within the College of Science and Engineering at the University of Edinburgh in Scotland.

The school was created in 1998 from the former department of artificial intelligence, the Centre for Cognitive Science and the department of computer science, along with the Artificial Intelligence Applications Institute (AIAI) and the Human Communication Research Centre.

Research in the School of Informatics draws on multiple disciplines. The school is particularly known for research in the areas of artificial intelligence, computational linguistics, systems biology, mathematical logic and theoretical computer science; but also contributes to many other areas of informatics.

The School of Informatics is ranked 22nd in the world by the QS World University Rankings 2027. As of October 2026, the school is ranked 1st in the UK according to CSRankings, 1st in the UK in the latest 2021 Research Excellence Framework (REF) by research power, and 1st in the world for natural language processing (NLP).

== Research ==
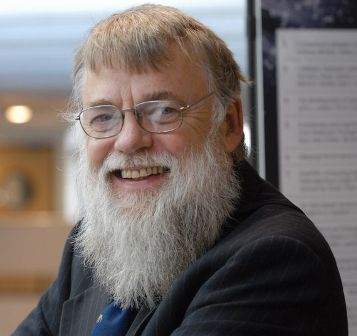
Professor Malcolm Atkinson

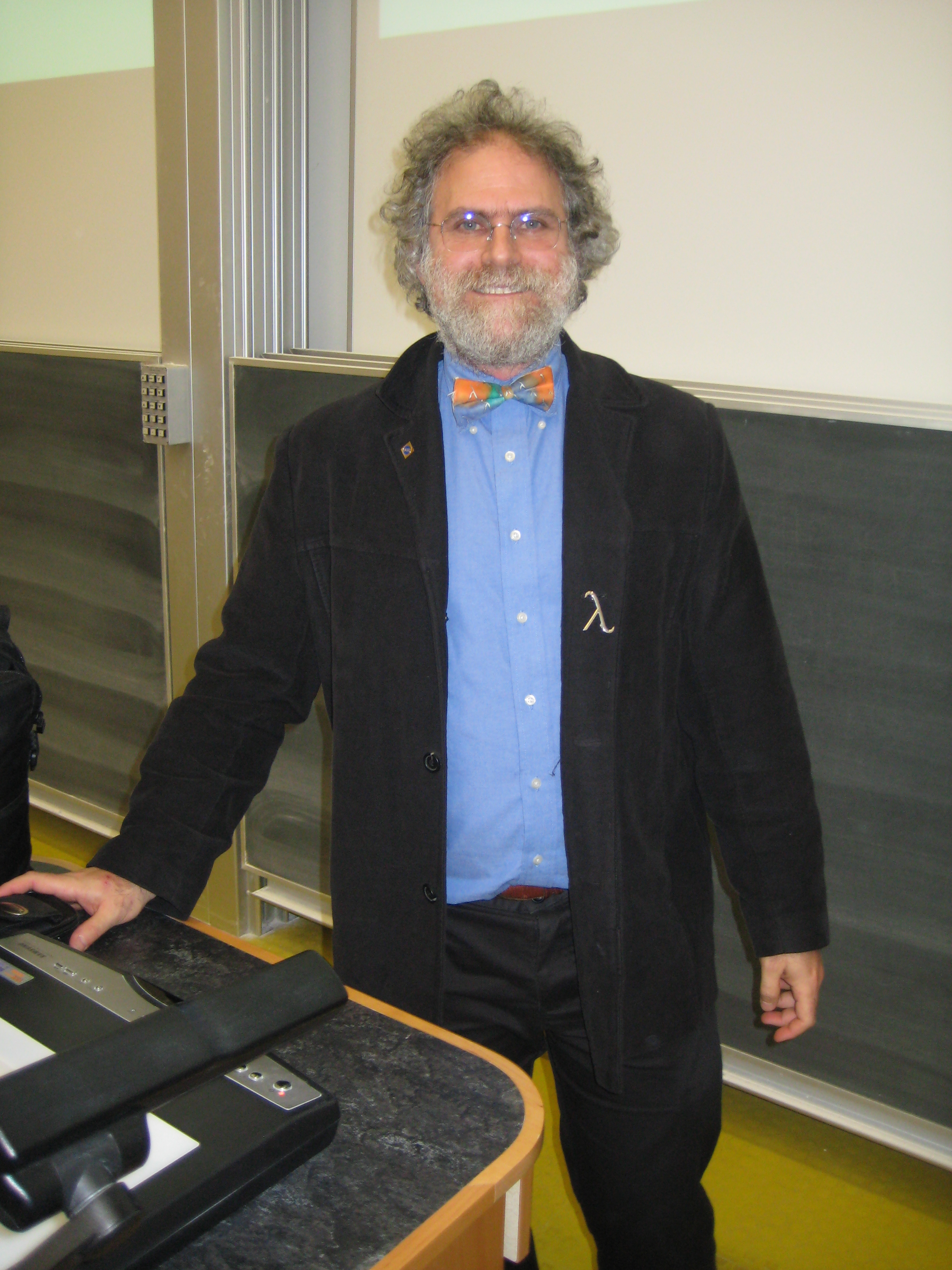
Professor Philip Wadler

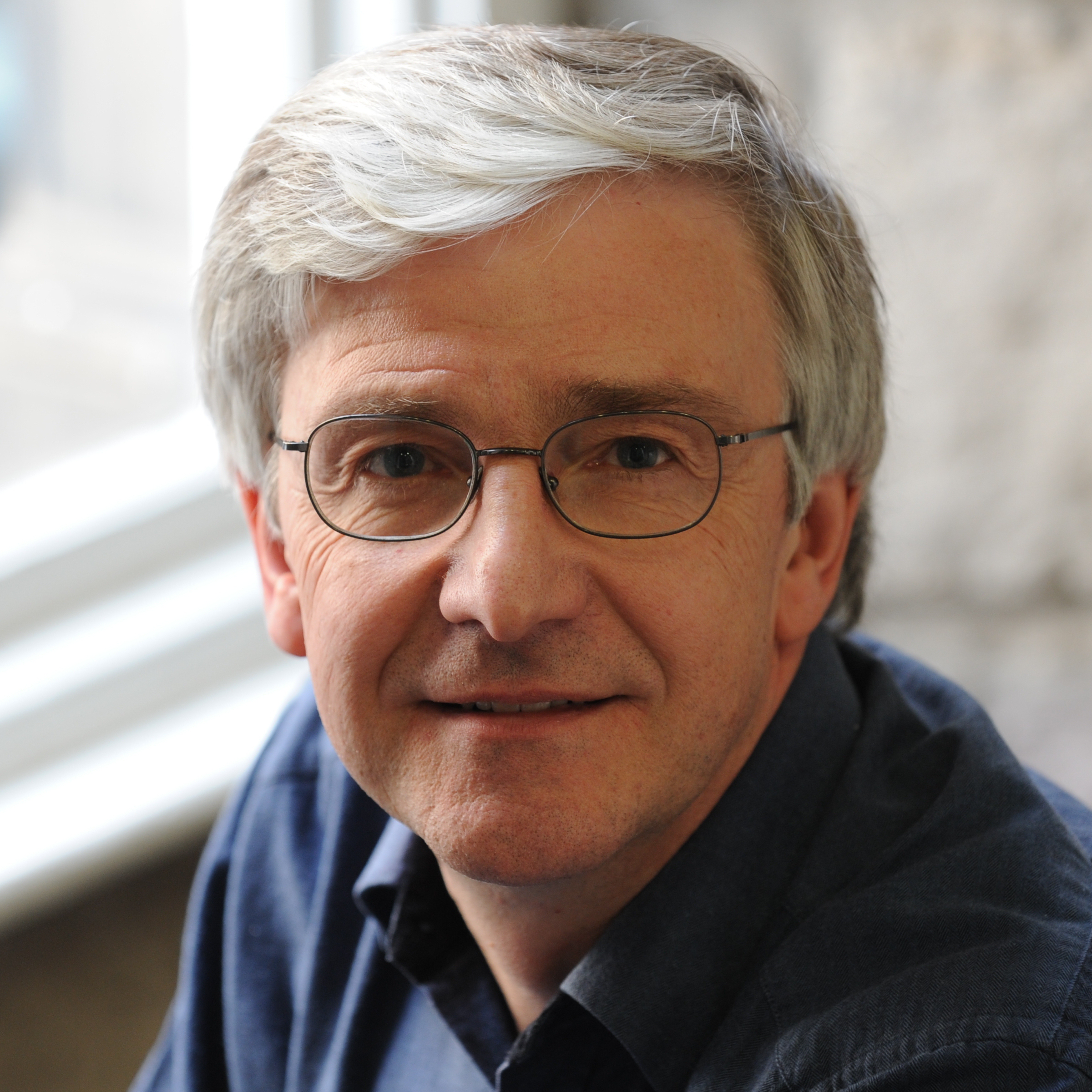
Professor Austin Tate

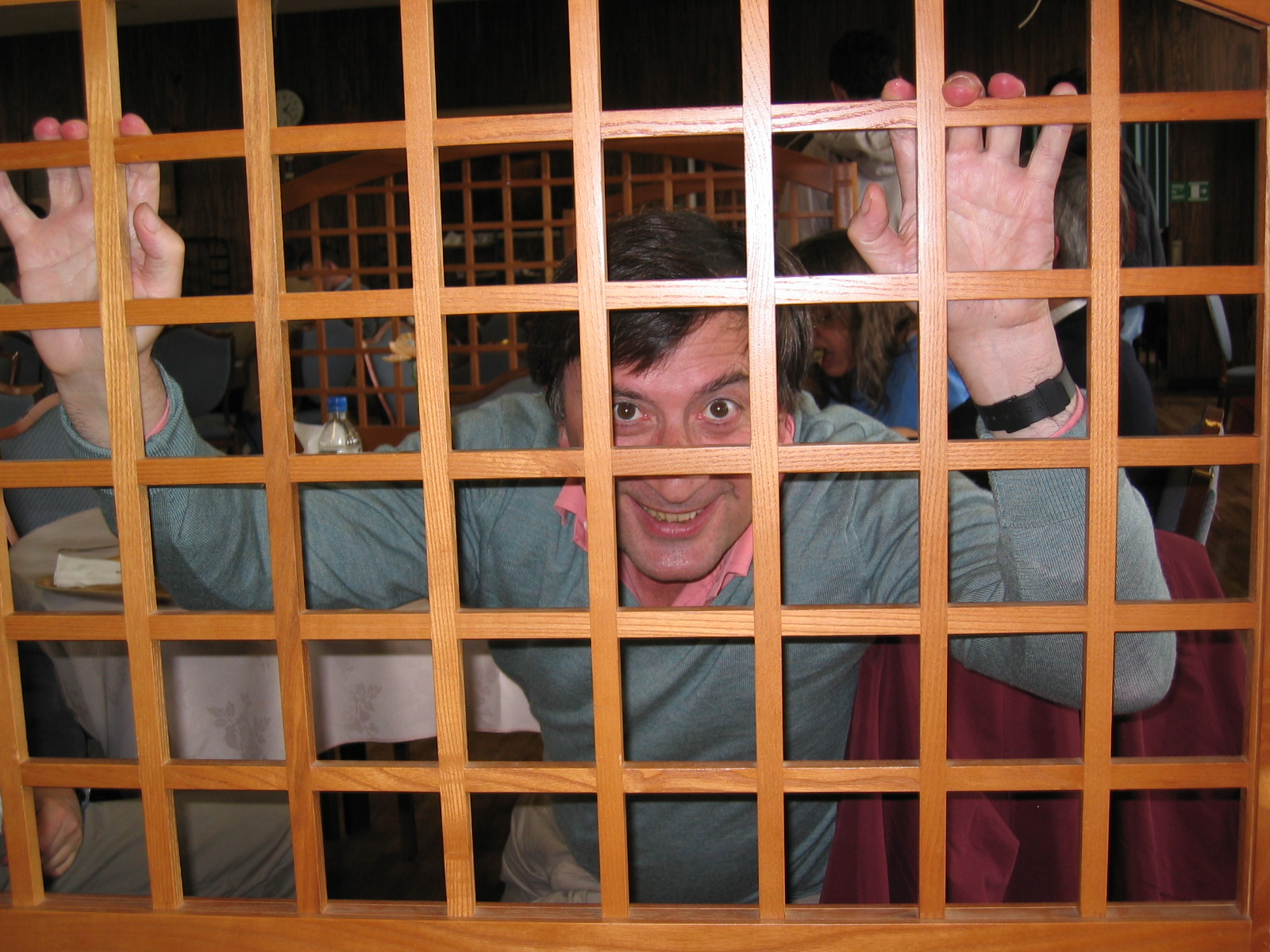
Professor Gordon Plotkin

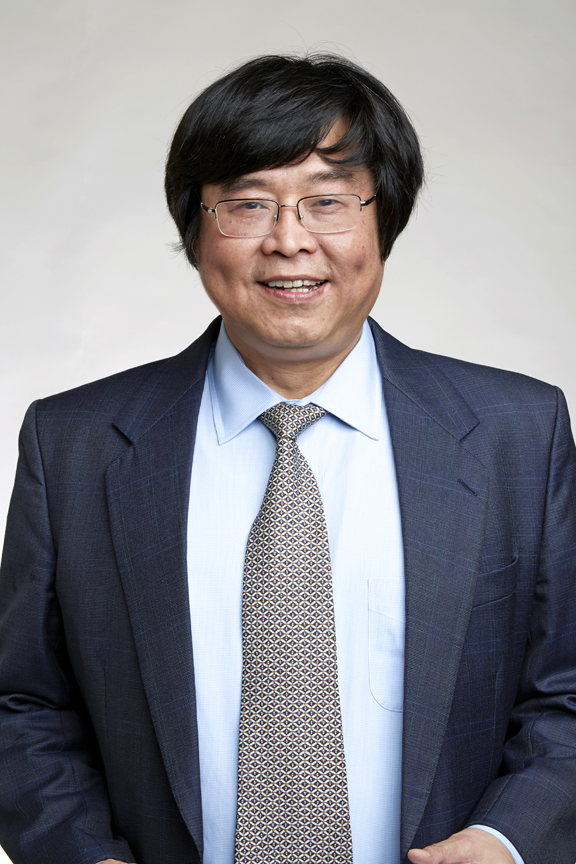
Professor Wenfei Fan

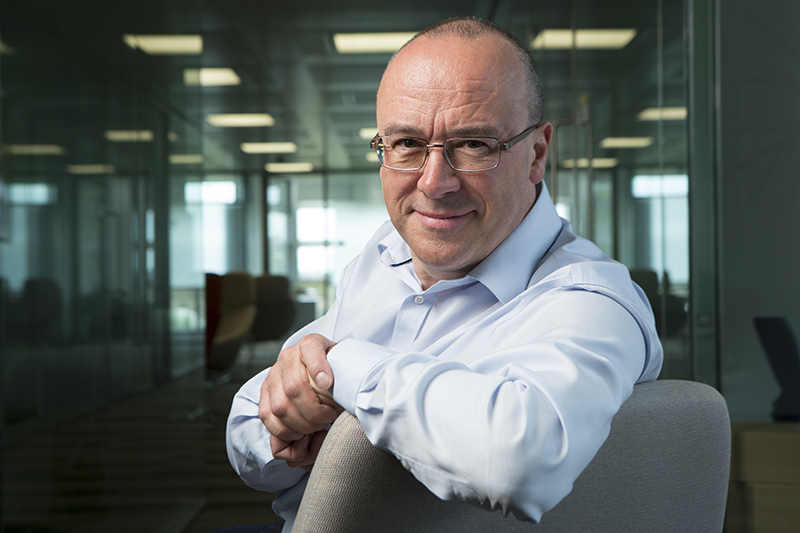
Professor Christopher Bishop

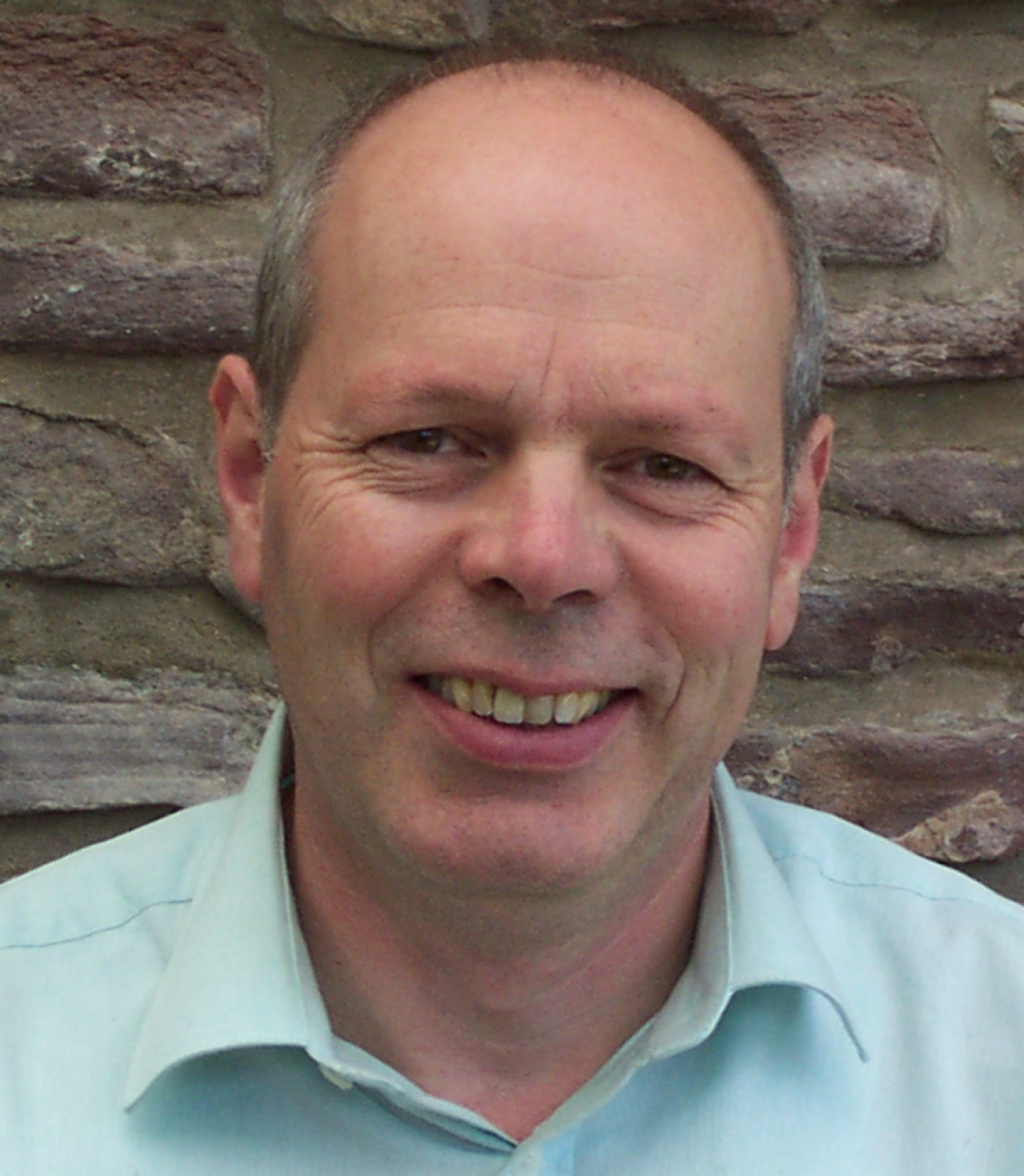
Professor Alan Bundy

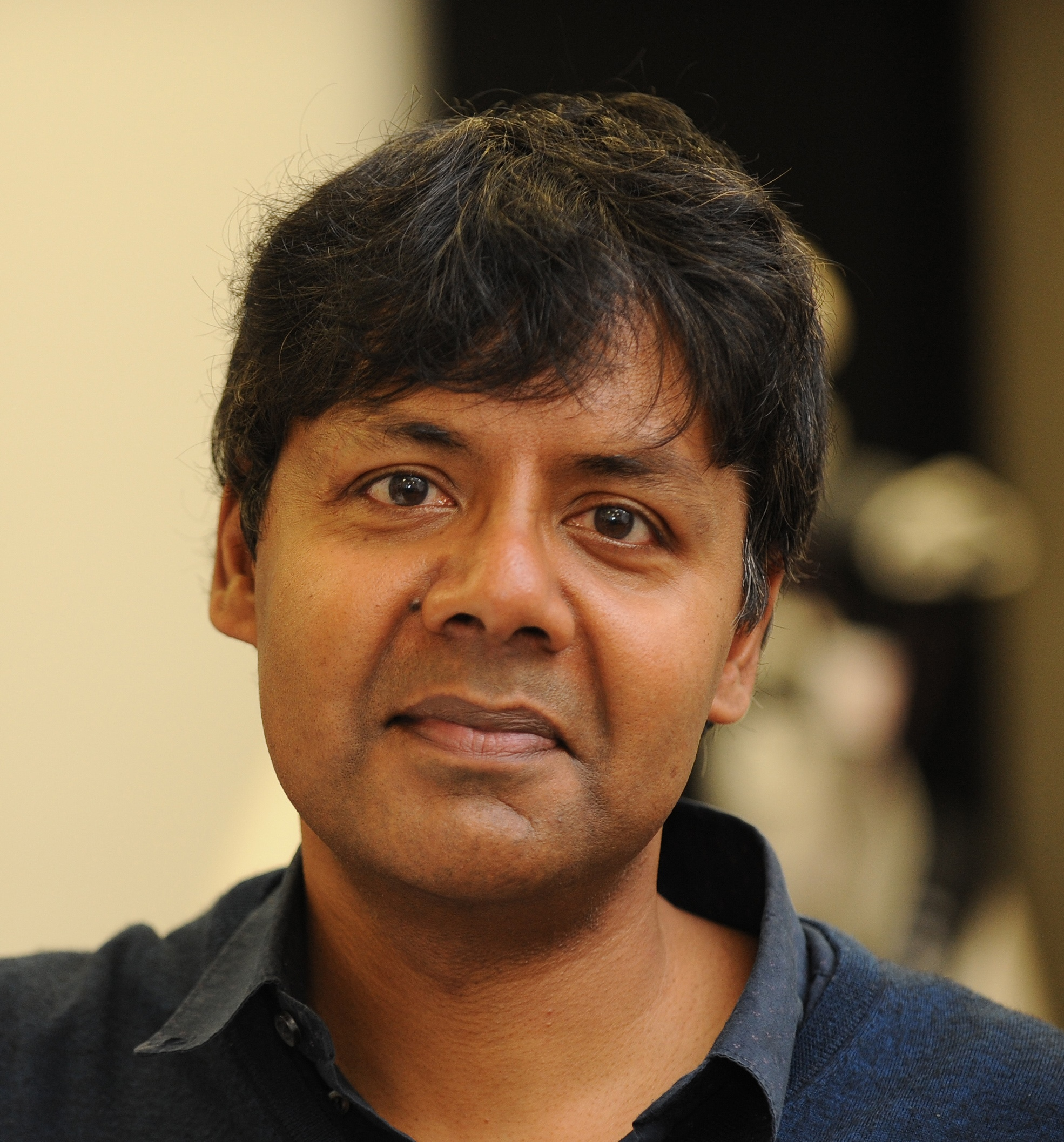
Professor Sethu Vijayakumar

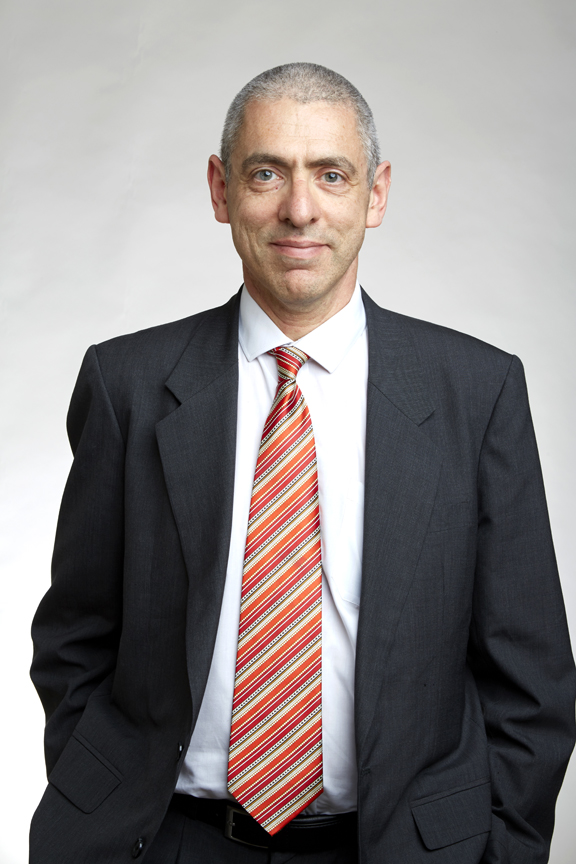
Professor Peter Dayan was awarded the Rumelhart Prize in 2012 and The Brain Prize in 2017. He completed his PhD at the University of Edinburgh in 1991.

The School of Informatics was awarded a 5*A in the UK HEFCE's 2001 RAE, the only computer science department in the country to achieve this highest possible rating. In the 2008 RAE, the School's "Quality Profile" was 35/50/15/0/0, which means that of the over 100 Full-time equivalent (FTE) staff research outputs evaluated, 35% were found "world-leading (4*)" and 50% "internationally excellent (3*)". These figures can be interpreted in a number of ways, but place the School first by volume and tied for second (following Cambridge with 45/45/10/0/0) by percentage of research rated 3* or 4*.

The School has a number of research institutes and centres :

=== Institute for Adaptive and Neural Computation: ANC ===
ANC investigates theoretical and empirical study of brain processes and artificial learning systems, drawing on neuroscience, cognitive science, computer science, computational science, mathematics and statistics.

=== Artificial Intelligence and its Applications Institute: AIAI ===
Previously known as CISA (Centre for Intelligent Systems and their Applications), the Artificial Intelligence and its Applications Institute (AIAI) works on the foundations of artificial intelligence and autonomous systems, and their application to real-world problems.

=== Institute for Language, Cognition, and Computation: ILCC ===
ILCC performs research on all aspects of natural language processing, drawing on machine learning, statistical modeling, and computational, psychological, and linguistic theories of communication among humans and between humans and machines using text, speech and other modalities.

=== Institute for Computing Systems Architecture: ICSA ===
ICSA performs research on architecture and engineering of future computing systems: performance and scalability; innovative algorithms, architectures, compilers, languages and protocols.

=== Institute of Perception, Action and Behaviour: IPAB ===
IPAB links computational action, perception, representation, transformation and generation processes to real or virtual worlds: statistical machine learning, computer vision, mobile and humanoid robotics, motor control, graphics and visualization.

=== Laboratory for Foundations of Computer Science: LFCS ===
The LFCS Develops and applies foundational understanding of computation and communication: formal models, mathematical theories, and software tools.

=== Quantum Software Lab ===
The Quantum Software Lab (QSL) is a research centre hosted within the School of Informatics that develops algorithms, verification protocols, and software stacks for quantum computing. Announced in November 2022 and formally opened in May 2023 through a memorandum of understanding with the UK's National Quantum Computing Centre (NQCC), the lab is directed by Elham Kashefi, who concurrently serves as Chief Scientist at the NQCC, alongside core faculty including Petros Wallden, Chris Heunen, Myrto Arapinis, Raúl García-Patrón, and Oliver Brown. Operating as a cross-college initiative within the College of Science and Engineering, QSL links researchers across the Schools of Informatics, Mathematics, Physics and Astronomy, Chemistry, and EPCC, and is associated with the EPSRC Centre for Doctoral Training in Quantum Informatics.

The laboratory's technical research focuses on measurement-based quantum computation, quantum verification and benchmarking, quantum error correction, and hybrid quantum–high-performance computing workflows. In November 2024, researchers at QSL executed a 52-vertex verified measurement-based quantum computation, the largest verified computation of its kind at the time, using an on-chip verification protocol on Quantinuum trapped-ion hardware. In February 2026, QSL coordinated the launch of the Quantum Software Alliance (QSA), an international research network chaired by Chris Heunen aimed at establishing open standards and policy frameworks for quantum algorithms and software.

In March 2026, as part of the UK Government's National Quantum Strategy, QSL was awarded £20 million to lead the four-year Quantum Advantage TurboCHarger (QATCH) programme in collaboration with the NQCC, developing software and verification tools across national hardware testbeds for applications including electricity grid forecasting with the National Energy System Operator (NESO). In June 2026, the lab received an additional £6.2 million grant through Ofgem's Strategic Innovation Fund to develop post-quantum cryptography and cyber-risk assessment tools for UK energy infrastructure.

== Senior academic staff and alumni ==
=== Current ===
Senior academic staff include:

- Malcolm Atkinson
- Alan Bundy
- Peter Buneman
- Christopher Bishop
- Rod Burstall, emeritus
- Kousha Etessami
- Wenfei Fan
- Michael Fourman
- Igor Goryanin
- Sharon Goldwater
- Dragan Gasevic
- Chris Heunen
- Jane Hillston
- Aggelos Kiayias
- Elham Kashefi
- Frank Keller
- Mirella Lapata
- Alex Lascarides
- Leonid Libkin
- Fiona McNeill
- Ursula Martin
- Johanna Moore
- Michael O'Boyle
- Gordon Plotkin
- Don Sannella
- Mark Steedman
- Perdita Stevens
- Keith Stenning
- Amos Storkey
- Austin Tate
- Sethu Vijayakumar
- Philip Wadler
- Barbara Webb
- Bonnie Webber

=== Former ===
- Donald Michie, founder of Artificial Intelligence in the UK
- Sidney Michaelson foundation chair of the former computer science department.
- Jon Oberlander

=== Notable alumni ===
Alumni of the school of informatics include:

- Geoffrey Hinton, computer scientist at Google Brain and winner of the Turing Award.
- Nigel Shadbolt, Chairman of the Open Data Institute (ODI) and master of Jesus College, Oxford

== Accommodation ==
The 2002 Cowgate fire destroyed a number of buildings, including 80 South Bridge, which housed around a quarter of the school and its renowned AI library. By January 2003, space was made available in the University's Appleton Tower as a replacement.

== See also ==
- Edinburgh Parallel Computing Centre
- ML
- Prolog
- WxWidgets
- Moses
- Hope
- NPL
- Freddy II
- Festival Speech Synthesis System
- LCF
- Edinburgh Multiple Access System
- Edinburgh IMP
- QCDOC
- Symbolic artificial intelligence
- Lighthill report
