= Biomedical Informatics Research Network =

The Biomedical Informatics Research Network, commonly referred among analysts as “BIRN” is a national proposed project to assist biomedical researchers in their bioscience investigations through data sharing and online collaborations. BIRN provides data-sharing infrastructure, advisory services from a single source and software tools and techniques. This national initiative is funded by NIH Grants, the National Center for Research Resources and the National Institute of General Medical Sciences (NIGMS), a component of the United States National Institutes of Health (NIH).

== Structure ==
BIRN is a collaborative effort between the NIGMS and a variety of nationwide leadership associations: USC Information Sciences Institute (USC ISI), University of Chicago, Massachusetts General Hospital, University of California, Irvine, and the University of California, Los Angeles.

Its interdisciplinary team consists of computer scientists, engineers, physicians, biomedical researchers and other technical experts, including grid computing developers Carl Kesselman of USC ISI, and Ian Foster of Argonne National Laboratories. Co-Principal Investigators are:

- Carl Kesselman, Ph.D., a professor in the University of Southern California (USC) Daniel J. Epstein Department of Industrial and Systems Engineering;
- Ian Foster, Ph.D., director of the Computation Institute, a joint project between the University of Chicago and Argonne National Laboratory, and associate director of Argonne's Mathematics and Computer Science Division;
- Steven G. Potkin, M.D., a professor in the Department of Psychiatry and Human Behavior at the University of California, Irvine (UCI) and Director of UCI's Brain Imaging Center;
- Bruce R. Rosen, M.D., Ph.D., a professor of radiology at Harvard Medical School and Health Sciences and Technology at the Harvard-MIT Division of Health Sciences and Technology, and Director of the Athinoula A. Martinos Center for Biomedical Imaging at the Massachusetts General Hospital
- Jonathan C. Silverstein, M.D., associate director and senior fellow at the University of Chicago-Argonne National Laboratory Computation Institute, and an associate professor of surgery, Radiology and Biological Sciences at UC;
- Arthur Toga, Ph.D., a professor in the University of Southern California.

== Resources ==
Users range from small research groups to larger researching groups. Like the National consortias such as the Nonhuman Primate Research Consortium (NHPRC) and the Cardiovascular Research Grid (CVRG), both funded by NIH.

By using BIRN's capabilities both to access data and perform research, groups can conduct large-scale data analysis while maximizing their existing technical infrastructure and expertise. Users also can participate in BIRN Working Groups that develop and support key functions, operations, security and data-sharing requirements.

BIRN offers a website, wiki, and mailing lists to help users stay current on news and information related to data-sharing considerations. The organization assists biomedical teams in selecting software, data, and metadata community standards, as well as setting up security mechanisms and sharing protocols for multi-institutional policies.

== History ==
BIRN was initially built around several “testbeds” or selected projects in neurology research and begun as an NCRR initiative. In 2008, its software expanded significantly to including data-sharing support across the entire biomedical research community. The network, being now open to all biomedical research groups is In belief that BIRN will benefit from its services, regardless of a group's specialty, mandate, size or U.S. location.

BIRN's mission also has shifted from having a central place for data to a means of supporting efficient data transfer. As a result, BIRN no longer provides hardware, offers or maintain servers (previously called “racks”) for storing user information, or uses participants’ computers as network interchange.

The user-driven, software-based approach instead supports data sharing on participants’ existing hardware and software. Each user group retains control over, and responsibility for, its own hardware—and for the security and privacy of its own information. Data is stored on users' systems rather than in a central repository, making possible storage of, and access to, vastly greater data quantities than was possible with BIRN “racks” alone.
