= Jade Alglave =

French computer scientist

Jade Alglave FREng (born 1984) is a French computer scientist whose research involves concurrency control, consistency models, weak hardware memory models, the relation between computer hardware and programming languages, and the "cat" domain-specific language for consistency models. She is a professor of computer science at University College London and a distinguished engineer at British semiconductor firm Arm.

== Education and career ==
Alglave was a student of Luc Maranget at INRIA. She completed a doctorate in 2010 at Paris Diderot University.

After postdoctoral research at the University of Oxford, she became a lecturer at Queen Mary University of London, working there with Peter O'Hearn and Byron Cook before following O'Hearn and Cook to University College London. Keeping her affiliation at University College London, Alglave also worked as a researcher at Microsoft Research Cambridge from 2014 to 2018, and at Arm beginning in 2018. In 2019, she was named as a professor at University College London.

== Recognition ==
Alglave won the 2014 Brian Mercer Award for Innovation of the Royal Society. She won the Silver Medal of the Royal Academy of Engineering in 2018. In 2020 the British Computer Society gave her the Roger Needham Award. In 2021 she was named a Fellow of the Royal Academy of Engineering.
