= Roger Needham Award =

Academic award

- Awarded for: “important contributions made to computer science research”
- Sponsored by: Microsoft Research; British Computer Society
- Date: 2004
- Reward: Gift of £5,000
- Website: www.bcs.org/more/awards-and-competitions/roger-needham-award/

The Roger Needham award is a prize given scientists who are recognised for important contributions made to computer science research The British Computer Society established an annual Roger Needham Award in honour of Roger Needham in 2004. It is a £5000 prize is presented to an individual for making "a distinguished research contribution in computer science by a UK-based researcher within ten years of their PhD." The award is funded by Microsoft Research. The winner of the prize has an opportunity to give a public lecture.

== Laureates ==
Since 2004, laureates have included:

- 2004 Jane Hillston on Tuning Systems: From Composition to Performance
- 2005 Ian Horrocks on Ontologies and the Semantic Web
- 2006 Andrew Fitzgibbon on Computer Vision & the Geometry of Nature
- 2007 Mark Handley on Evolving the Internet: Challenges, Opportunities and Consequences
- 2008 Wenfei Fan on A Revival of Data Dependencies for Improving Data Quality
- 2009 Byron Cook on Proving that programs eventually do something good
- 2010 Joel Ouaknine on Timing is Everything
- 2011 Maja Pantić on Machine Understanding of Human Behaviour
- 2012 Dino Distefano on Memory Safety Proofs for the Masses
- 2013 Boris Motik on Theory and Practice: The Yin and Yang of Intelligent Information Systems
- 2014 Natasa Przulj on Mining Biological Networks
- 2015 Niloy Mitra on Linking Form and Function, Computationally
- 2016 Sharon Goldwater Language Learning in Humans and Machines: Making Connections to Make Progress
- 2017 Alastair F. Donaldson on Many-Core Programming: How to Go Really Fast Without Crashing
- 2018 Alexandra Silva
- 2019 Cristian Cadar
- 2020 Jade Alglave

== See also ==
- List of computer science awards
