= Chris Heunen =

Dutch mathematician and computer scientist

- Born: Christiaan Johan Marie Heunen; 21 March 1982 (age 44); Nijmegen, Netherlands
- Education: Radboud University Nijmegen (MSc, PhD)
- Known for: Quasi-Borel spaces Distributed quantum circuits
- Awards: Birkhoff–von Neumann Prize (2012)
- Scientific career
- Fields: Category theory, quantum computing, quantum programming, programming language semantics
- Workplaces: University of Edinburgh; University of Oxford
- Thesis: Categorical Quantum Models and Logics (2010)
- Doctoral advisors: Bart Jacobs; Klaas Landsman
- Website: homepages.inf.ed.ac.uk/cheunen/

Christiaan Johan Marie "Chris" Heunen is a Dutch mathematician and computer scientist. He is Professor of Quantum Programming in the School of Informatics, University of Edinburgh. His research applies category theory to the foundations of quantum theory, to quantum programming, and to the semantics of probabilistic programming. He is known for co-developing a topos-theoretic approach to quantum theory, for co-introducing quasi-Borel spaces, and for a method of distributing quantum circuits across networked quantum processors.

== Early life and education ==
Heunen was born on 21 March 1982 in Nijmegen. He studied mathematics and computer science at Radboud University Nijmegen, receiving master's degrees in both in 2005. He completed his doctorate there with a thesis entitled Categorical Quantum Models and Logics, supervised by Bart Jacobs and Klaas Landsman. He defended it in January 2010.

== Career ==
After his doctorate, Heunen held a Rubicon fellowship from the Netherlands Organisation for Scientific Research at the University of Oxford, during which he was also a visiting researcher at the California Institute of Technology. From 2014 he held an Engineering and Physical Sciences Research Council Early Career Fellowship, initially at Oxford. He joined the School of Informatics at the University of Edinburgh in October 2015.

In 2023 he became director of a Quantum and AI Centre of Excellence set up by the University of Edinburgh with Cisco. In 2024 he was named lead of the EPSRC Centre for Doctoral Training in Quantum Informatics, which Edinburgh runs with the University of Oxford, the University of Strathclyde, Heriot-Watt University and University College London. He chairs the steering committee of the Quantum Software Alliance, an international network of quantum software research centres launched in 2026.

== Research ==
=== Topos approach to quantum theory ===
With Klaas Landsman and Bas Spitters, Heunen developed a topos-theoretic formulation of quantum theory. Motivated by Niels Bohr's doctrine of classical concepts, it studies a quantum system through the family of its commutative subalgebras. The philosopher Benjamin Eva discussed this "covariant" approach alongside the topos programme of Andreas Döring and Chris Isham, arguing that both face similar difficulties of interpretation.

=== Probabilistic programming ===
In 2017 Heunen, Ohad Kammar, Sam Staton and Hongseok Yang introduced quasi-Borel spaces, a mathematical setting for higher-order probabilistic programming languages that supports both continuous probability and function types. Other researchers have used quasi-Borel spaces as the basis of a verification framework for higher-order probabilistic programs and have formalised the theory in the Isabelle proof assistant.

=== Distributed quantum computing ===
With his doctoral student Pablo Andrés-Martínez, Heunen developed a method for distributing a quantum circuit across several networked quantum processors by reducing the task to hypergraph partitioning. A 2025 review of distributed quantum computing described the work as one of the most significant contributions to the field and a foundational reference for later research, while noting that it did not explore the full space of possible partitions. Other researchers used the method as a benchmark when developing new algorithms. Researchers at Quantinuum, including Andrés-Martínez, later extended it to networks of heterogeneous quantum computers, implementing it in the pytket-dqc software package.

=== Axioms for Hilbert spaces ===
With Andre Kornell, Heunen gave purely categorical axioms that characterise the category of Hilbert spaces and bounded linear maps. Stephen Lack and Shay Tobin later gave a related characterisation, following the same approach, that also covers quaternionic Hilbert spaces.

=== Quantum programming languages ===
His recent work develops equational foundations for quantum programming languages. With Jacques Carette, Robin Kaarsgaard, Neil J. Ross and Amr Sabry, he gave an axiomatisation of quantum computing built on reversible classical computing, replacing the continuous postulates of quantum theory with a small set of discrete equations.

== Books ==
Heunen and Jamie Vicary wrote Categories for Quantum Theory: An Introduction, published by Oxford University Press in 2019 as volume 28 of the Oxford Graduate Texts in Mathematics. A reviewer for zbMATH Open praised its balance of theory and applications, and a reviewer for Mathematical Reviews found it self-contained and accessible. A Japanese translation by Haruyuki Kawabe was published by Morikita Publishing in 2021.

Heunen also co-edited Quantum Physics and Linguistics: A Compositional, Diagrammatic Discourse (Oxford University Press, 2013) with Mehrnoosh Sadrzadeh and Edward Grefenstette.

== Recognition and service ==
Heunen received the Birkhoff–von Neumann Prize of the International Quantum Structures Association in 2012. He was one of the founding editors of the journal Quantum in 2016, and has been a member of its steering board since 2021. He was a member of the founding editorial board of the journal Compositionality in 2018. He is an associate editor of ACM Transactions on Computational Logic, and a member of the International Federation for Information Processing working group on the foundations of quantum computation.

== Selected publications ==
- Heunen, Chris; Landsman, Nicolaas P.; Spitters, Bas (2009). "A topos for algebraic quantum theory". Communications in Mathematical Physics. 291 (1): 63–110. arXiv:0709.4364. doi:10.1007/s00220-009-0865-6.
- Heunen, Chris; Kammar, Ohad; Staton, Sam; Yang, Hongseok (2017). A convenient category for higher-order probability theory. 32nd Annual ACM/IEEE Symposium on Logic in Computer Science (LICS). pp. 1–12. arXiv:1701.02547. doi:10.1109/LICS.2017.8005137.
- Andrés-Martínez, Pablo; Heunen, Chris (2019). "Automated distribution of quantum circuits via hypergraph partitioning". Physical Review A. 100 (3). 032308. arXiv:1811.10972. doi:10.1103/PhysRevA.100.032308.
- Heunen, Chris; Kornell, Andre (2022). "Axioms for the category of Hilbert spaces". Proceedings of the National Academy of Sciences. 119 (9). e2117024119. arXiv:2109.07418. doi:10.1073/pnas.2117024119.
- Heunen, Chris; Vicary, Jamie (2019). Categories for Quantum Theory: An Introduction. Oxford Graduate Texts in Mathematics. Vol. 28. Oxford University Press. doi:10.1093/oso/9780198739623.001.0001. ISBN 978-0-19-873962-3.
