= BCS Lovelace Medal =

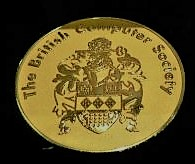
- Awarded for: "Individuals who have made an outstanding contribution to the understanding or advancement of Computing."
- Country: United Kingdom
- Presented by: BCS, The Chartered Institute for IT
- First award: 1998
- Currently held by: Michael Kölling; Mirella Lapata
- Website: www.bcs.org/events/awards-and-competitions/bcs-lovelace-medal

The Lovelace Medal was established by BCS, The Chartered Institute for IT in 1998, and is presented to individuals who have made outstanding contributions to the understanding or advancement of computing. It is the top award in computing in the UK. Awardees deliver the Lovelace Lecture.

The award is named after Countess Ada Lovelace, an English mathematician, scientist, and writer. Lovelace was the daughter of Lord Byron. She worked with computer pioneer Charles Babbage on the proposed mechanical general-purpose computer, the Analytical Engine, in 1842 and is often described as the world's first computer programmer.

The medal is intended to be presented to individuals, without regard to their countries of domicile, provided a direct connection to the UK. It is generally anticipated that there will be one medalist for research and one for education each year, but the regulation does not preclude either several medalists or no medalist.

== Medal recipients ==
Awardees include:

- 2025 Michael Kölling - for his transformative impact on programming education worldwide.
- 2025 Mirella Lapata - for her pioneering research in natural language processing and AI.
- 2024 - Dr. Syed Sahil Khaja - for his pioneering contribution in exemplary leadership in fintech technologies, evolution of blockchain and in the field of cybersecurity.
- 2024 Sue Sentance – for her exceptional contributions and research in computing education.
- 2024 Philippa Gardner – for her contributions to mechanised language specification and scalable software verification and true bug detection.
- 2024 Aggelos Kiayias – for his transformative contributions to the theory and practice of cyber security and cryptography.
- 2023 Tom Crick – for contributions to computer science education across research, policy and practice.
- 2023 Demis Hassabis – for research in recognition of his extraordinary contribution to artificial intelligence and to the UK technology industry.
- 2023 Jane Hillston – for research in recognition of her work developing new approaches to modelling both artificial and natural systems by combining elements of formal languages with mathematical modelling.
- 2020 Ian Horrocks – for significant contributions to the advancements of reasoning systems
- 2020 Nick Jennings and Michael Wooldridge – for contributions to multi-agent systems
- 2019 Marta Kwiatkowska – for probabilistic model checking for the data-rich world
- 2018 Gordon Plotkin – for contributions to semantic framework for programming languages
- 2017 Georg Gottlob – for contributions to the logical and theoretical foundations of databases
- 2016 Andrew Blake – for contributions to the understanding and advancement of computing as a discipline
- 2015 Ross J. Anderson – for contributions to building security engineering into a discipline
- 2014 Steve Furber – for designing the ARM microprocessor architecture and contributions to computer systems
- 2013 Samson Abramsky – for contributions to domain theory, game semantics and categorical quantum mechanics
- 2012 Grady Booch – for contributions to software architecture, software engineering and collaborative environments
- 2011 Hermann Hauser– for entrepreneurship and for co-developing the BBC Micro Computer
- 2010 John C. Reynolds – for contributions to logical foundations of programs and programming languages
- 2009 Yorick Wilks – for contributions to meaning-based understanding of natural language
- 2008 Tony Storey – for contributions to Autonomic Computing
- 2007 Karen Spärck Jones – for contributions to natural language processing
- 2006 Sir Tim Berners-Lee – for inventing the World Wide Web
- 2005 Nick McKeown – for contributions to router hardware design
- 2004 John Warnock of Adobe Systems – for contributions in document processing
- 2002 Ian Foster and Carl Kesselman – for contributions to grid computing
- 2001 Douglas C. Engelbart – for inventing the computer mouse
- 2000 Linus Torvalds – for creating the Linux kernel operating system
- 1998 Michael A. Jackson and Chris Burton – for program design and structured programming

== See also ==
- List of computer science awards
- Ada Lovelace Award
