= KRKN =

- Eldon, Iowa; United States
- Broadcast area: Ottumwa
- Frequency: 104.3 MHz
- Branding: New Country 104.3

Programming
- Format: Country
- Affiliations: WestwoodOne

Ownership
- Owner: O-Town Communications, Inc.
- Sister stations: KLEE; KOTM-FM; KBIZ; KKSI; KTWA

History
- First air date: 1996

Technical information
- Licensing authority: FCC
- Facility ID: 58762
- Class: C3
- ERP: 23,500 watts
- HAAT: 104 meters (341 ft)
- Transmitter coordinates: 40°52′6″N 92°18′20″W

Links
- Public license information: Public file; LMS
- Website: ottumwaradio.com/104-3-krkn/

KRKN (104.3 FM, "New Country 104.3") is a radio station broadcasting a country music format. Licensed to Eldon, Iowa, United States, the station serves the Ottumwa area. The station is owned by Greg List, through licensee O-Town Communications, Inc.
