= Michael O'Boyle =

- Education: University of Manchester
- Scientific career
- Workplaces: University of Edinburgh
- Doctoral advisor: John Gurd

Michael O'Boyle is a professor of Computing and Director of the Institute for Computing Systems Architecture at the University of Edinburgh School of Informatics.

== Education ==
O'Boyle received a Master of Science degree in computer science from the University of Manchester in 1990. He completed his PhD at the University of Manchester in 1992 under the supervision of John Gurd.

== Research ==
O'Boyle's research interests include adaptive compilation, machine learning based optimization, auto-parallelising compilers and heterogeneous GPGPU multi-core platforms. He is project leader of the MilePost gcc project and founding member of the European Network of Excellence on High Performance and Embedded Architecture and Compilation.
