= Andrew Fitzgibbon (engineer) =

Irish computer scientist (born 1968)

- Born: 1968 (age 57–58); Dublin, Ireland
- Education: University of Edinburgh; Heriot-Watt University; University College, Cork
- Awards: MacRobert Award, Microsoft Team (2011); FREng (2014)
- Scientific career
- Fields: Computer science
- Workplaces: University of Oxford
- Thesis: Stable Segmentation of 2D Curves (1997)
- Doctoral advisor: Robert B Fisher
- Website: www.fitzgibbon.ie

Andrew Fitzgibbon FREng FRS (born 1968) is an Irish researcher in computer vision. Since 2022, he has worked at Graphcore.

== Education ==
Fitzgibbon went to school at Coláiste Chríost Rí in Cork, and then studied Computer Science and Mathematics (Joint Honours) at University College, Cork, graduating in 1989. He pursued a one-year Masters' in Knowledge-based Systems at Heriot-Watt University. Rather than start a PhD, he began work as a research assistant at the Department of Artificial Intelligence, University of Edinburgh, writing computer programs for 3D shape modelling and 3D scanning. In 1992 he registered for a part-time PhD, which was awarded in 1997.

== Career and research ==
In 1996 he moved to the robotics research group at the Department of Engineering Science, University of Oxford, working with Andrew Zisserman, and in 1998 their work on Structure from motion, jointly with Phillip Torr, was awarded the International Conference on Computer Vision Marr Prize. This work led to the foundation of the company 2d3 in 1999, and the product "boujou", which won a Primetime Emmy Award for technical achievement. In 1999, he was awarded a Royal Society University Research Fellowship, and continued to work with Zisserman. Their work on applying machine learning to image-based rendering (with Yonatan Wexler) led to the award in 2003 of a second conference paper Marr Prize.

In 2005, he moved to Microsoft Research, and began work on human body tracking, and later contributed to the group development of the machine learning component of the human motion capture software in the Kinect system. This group work was honoured with the MacRobert Award of the Royal Academy of Engineering for Microsoft Cambridge team in 2011.

Since 2022, he has worked at Graphcore.

== Awards and honours ==
- Marr Prize, Conference Paper Prize, 1998, 2003.
- Technology & Engineering Emmy Award, 2001, for boujou.
- British Computer Society Roger Needham Award, 2006.
- Fellow of the British Computer Society, 2012.
- Fellow of the International Association for Pattern Recognition, 2012.
- Silver Medal, Royal Academy of Engineering, 2013.
- Fellow of the Royal Academy of Engineering, 2014.
- British Machine Vision Association (BMVA) Distinguished Fellow, 2017.
- Fellow of the Royal Society, 2024.
