= Jane Hillston =

British computer scientist (born 1963)

Jane Hillston MBE FRS FRSE
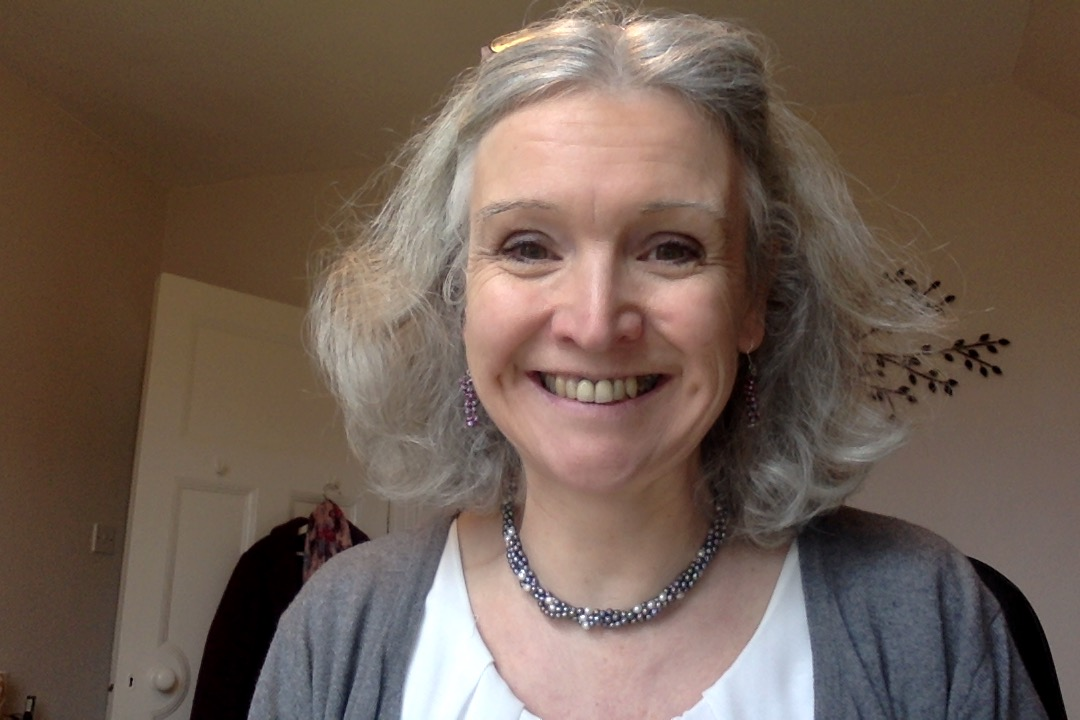
- Prof Jane Hillston in 2021.
- Born: 1963 (age 62–63)
- Education: University of York; Lehigh University; University of Edinburgh
- Known for: PEPA
- Awards: Roger Needham Award (2004), Suffrage Science Award (2018)
- Scientific career
- Workplaces: University of Edinburgh
- Thesis: A Compositional Approach to Performance Modelling (1994)
- Doctoral advisor: Robert J. Pooley; Julian Bradfield

Jane Elizabeth Hillston (born 1963) is a British computer scientist who is professor of quantitative modelling and former head of school in the School of Informatics, University of Edinburgh, Scotland.

== Early life and education ==
Hillston received a BA in Mathematics from the University of York in 1985, an MSc in Mathematics from Lehigh University in the United States in 1987 and a PhD in Computer Science from the University of Edinburgh in 1994, where she has spent her subsequent academic career. Her PhD thesis was awarded the BCS/CPHC Distinguished Dissertation Awards in 1995 and has been published by Cambridge University Press.

== Research and career ==
She has been an EPSRC Research Fellow (1994–1995), Lecturer (1995–2001), Reader (2001–2006) and Professor of Quantitative Modelling since 2006. Hillston is a member of the Laboratory for Foundations of Computer Science at Edinburgh. In 2018 she was appointed Head of the School of Informatics at Edinburgh, taking over from Johanna Moore, until succeeded by Helen Hastie in 2023.

Jane Hillston is known for her work on stochastic process algebras. In particular, she has developed the PEPA process algebra, and helped develop Bio-PEPA, which is based on the earlier PEPA algebra and is specifically aimed at analyzing biochemical networks.

Since January 1st 2023 Hillston has been Editor-in-Chief of Proceedings of the Royal Society A (the first female Editor-in-Chief in the journal's history). She also serves on the editorial board of Logical Methods in Computer Science, Theoretical Computer Science, as one of the editors in the area of Theory of Natural Computing, and as an Associate Editor of ACM Transactions on Modeling and Computer Simulation (TOMACS).

== Honours and awards ==
In 2004, she received the first Roger Needham Award at the Royal Society in London awarded yearly for a distinguished research contributor in computer research by a UK-based researcher within ten years of their PhD. In March 2007 she was elected to the fellowship of the Royal Society of Edinburgh. In 2018, Hillston was elected the membership of the Academia Europaea. In 2018 she was a recipient of the Suffrage Science Award for Computer Science. In 2021 she was awarded the RSE Lord Kelvin Medal.

She led the University of Edinburgh School of Informatics in applying for an Athena SWAN Award, which they subsequently achieved silver in. The award shows that the department provides a "supportive environment" for female students.

Hillston was elected a Fellow of the Royal Society in May 2022. in 2023 she won the BCS Lovelace Medal for research in recognition of her work developing new approaches to modelling both artificial and natural systems by combining elements of formal languages with mathematical modelling.

She was appointed Member of the Order of the British Empire (MBE) in the 2023 Birthday Honours for services to computer science and women in science.
