= KKSI =

- Eddyville, Iowa; United States
- Broadcast area: Ottumwa, Iowa
- Frequency: 101.5 MHz
- Branding: 101.5 KISS FM

Programming
- Format: Classic rock
- Affiliations: Premiere Networks

Ownership
- Owner: O-Town Communications, Inc.; (O-Town Communications, Inc.)
- Sister stations: KLEE, KOTM-FM, KBIZ, KRKN, KTWA

History
- First air date: 1990
- Former call signs: KRAM (1989–1990, CP)
- Call sign meaning: "Kiss"

Technical information
- Licensing authority: FCC
- Facility ID: 49902
- Class: C2
- ERP: 49,000 watts
- HAAT: 152 meters (499 ft)
- Transmitter coordinates: 41°07′57″N 92°42′12″W

Links
- Public license information: Public file; LMS
- Webcast: Listen Live
- Website: KKSI Online

KKSI (101.5 FM, "101.5 KISS FM") is a radio station licensed to serve Eddyville, Iowa, United States. The station, established in 1990, is owned by Greg List, through licensee O-Town Communications, Inc.

KKSI broadcasts a classic rock music format to the greater Ottumwa, Iowa, area. Although its tower and transmitter are located near Eddyville, between Ottumwa and Oskaloosa, the KKSI radio studios are located in Ottumwa.

The station was assigned the KKSI call sign by the Federal Communications Commission on April 27, 1990.
