= Ian Horrocks =

British academic (b.1958)

Ian Horrocks FRS
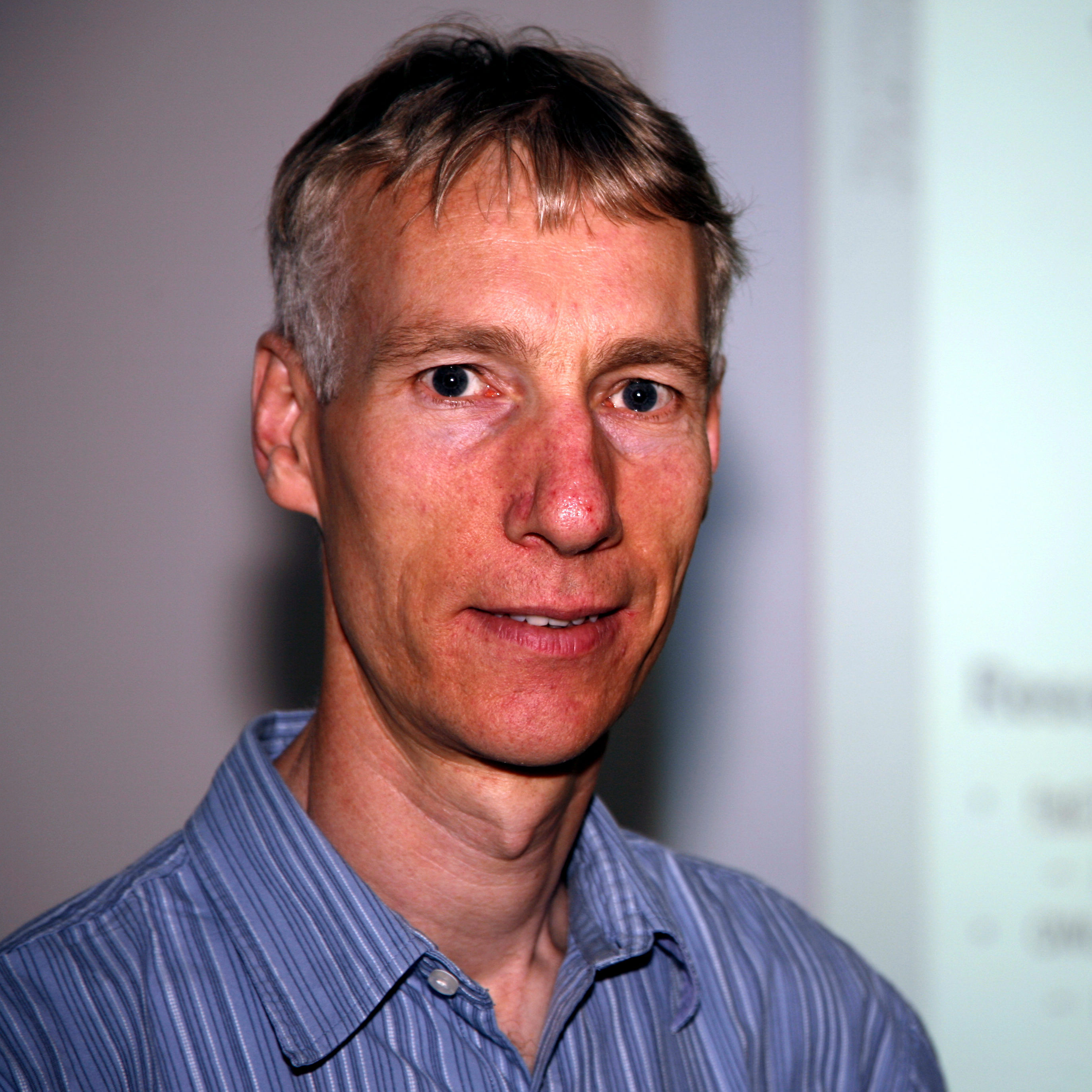
- Ian Horrocks
- Born: Ian Robert Horrocks; 11 March 1958 (age 68); Liverpool
- Education: University of Manchester (BSc, MSc, PhD)
- Known for: Description Logic; Web Ontology Language
- Awards: BCS Lovelace Medal (2020). Roger Needham Award (2005)
- Scientific career
- Fields: Semantic Web; Ontologies; Knowledge Representation; Artificial intelligence; Logic in computer science
- Workplaces: University of Oxford; Oriel College, Oxford; University of Manchester
- Thesis: Optimising tableaux decision procedures for description logics (1997)
- Website: www.cs.ox.ac.uk/people/ian.horrocks

Ian Robert Horrocks FRS is a professor of computer science at the University of Oxford in the UK and a Fellow of Oriel College, Oxford. His research focuses on knowledge representation and reasoning, particularly ontology languages, description logic and optimised tableaux decision procedures.

== Education ==
Horrocks completed his Bachelor of Science (BSc), Master of Science (MSc) and PhD degrees in the Department of Computer Science at the University of Manchester.

== Research and career ==
After several years as a lecturer, senior lecturer, reader then Professor in Manchester, Horrocks moved to the University of Oxford in 2008. His work on tableau reasoning for very expressive description logics has formed the basis of most description logic reasoning systems in use today, including Racer, FaCT++, HermiT and Pellet.

Horrocks was jointly responsible for development of the OIL and DAML+OIL ontology languages, and he played a central role in the development of the Web Ontology Language (OWL). These languages and associated tools have been used by Open Biomedical Ontologies (OBO) Consortium, the National Cancer Institute (NCI) in America, the United Nations (UN) Food and Agriculture Organization (FAO), the World Wide Web Consortium (W3C) and a range of major corporations and government agencies.

His research is partly funded by the Engineering and Physical Sciences Research Council (EPSRC).

Horrocks served as editor-in-chief of Journal of Web Semantics from 2012 until late 2022. Together with the other editors-in-chief at the time, he resigned from his position at the Elsevier journal, and became editor-in-chief of the newly founded diamond open access journal Transactions on Graph Data and Knowledge. Horrocks also served as program chair of the 1st International Semantic Web Conference (ISWC) in 2002 and as the general chair of ISWC 2010.

=== Awards and honours ===
In 2020 Horrocks was awarded the BCS Lovelace Medal in recognition of his significant contribution to the advancement of reasoning systems.

Horrocks was elected a Fellow of the Royal Society (FRS) in 2011 and won the Roger Needham Award of the British Computer Society (BCS) in 2005.

=== Oxford Semantic Technologies ===
In 2017 Horrocks co-founded the University spin-off Oxford Semantic Technologies Limited with two of his colleagues; Bernardo Cuenca Grau and Boris Motik.
