= Johanna Moore =

Computer scientist

- Education: UCLA
- Awards: FRSE (2003)
- Scientific career
- Fields: Computational linguistics Cognitive science
- Workplaces: University of Edinburgh School of Informatics

Johanna Doris Moore is a computational linguist and cognitive scientist. Her research publications include contributions to natural language generation, spoken dialogue systems, computational models of discourse, intelligent tutoring and training systems, human-computer interaction, user modeling, and knowledge representation.

== Education ==
She received a BS in Mathematics and Computer Science (summa cum laude) in 1980, an MS in Computer Science in 1982, and PhD (Advisors: William Swartout, Gerald Estrin) in 1989, all from UCLA.

== Career ==
Moore has held posts at UCLA (1976–1986), USC Information Sciences Institute (1983–1989), and the University of Pittsburgh (1990–1998).

Since 1998 she has held the Chair in Artificial Intelligence within the School of Informatics at the University of Edinburgh. She has served as Director of the Human Communication Research Centre, and as Co-Director of the Institute for Language, Cognition and Computation.

From 2014-2018 she was head of the School of Informatics and in 2016 instigated the Blockchain Technology Laboratory. She was succeeded as head of the school by Professor Jane Hillston. She is ranked as one of the top 10 computer scientists at Edinburgh with a H-index of 58.

In mid-2024, she was listed as one of the top 200 computer scientists in Scotland, with a D-index of 57 across 245 publications.

In 2024, she is Associate Editor for the Cognitive Speech and Speech Communication journals.

== Awards and honours ==
Moore was elected to the UCLA chapter of Phi Beta Kappa in 1980. She held an Office of Naval Research Fellowship from 1982 to 1985, and was an IBM Fellow from 1985 to 1987. She held a National Science Foundation National Young Investigator Award, from 1994 to 1999. She has been Chair of the Cognitive Science Society, and was President of the Association for Computational Linguistics in 2004.

She is a Fellow of the British Computer Society. In 2003 she was elected a Fellow of the Royal Society of Edinburgh.

== Research projects ==
From June 2015 to May 2016, Moore carried out a research project on Connected Digital Economy.

In 2024, her most recent publications focus on the areas of Self-regulated learning.
