= KTWA =

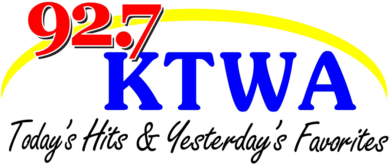
- Ottumwa, Iowa; United States
- Broadcast area: Southern Iowa
- Frequency: 92.7 MHz
- Branding: 92.7 KTWA

Programming
- Format: Adult contemporary
- Affiliations: Citadel Media

Ownership
- Owner: Linder Radio Group; (O-Town Communications, Inc.)
- Sister stations: KLEE, KOTM-FM, KBIZ, KRKN, KKSI

History
- First air date: December 1984
- Call sign meaning: OtTumWA

Technical information
- Licensing authority: FCC
- Facility ID: 24204
- Class: C2
- ERP: 50,000 watts
- HAAT: 97 meters (318 ft)
- Transmitter coordinates: 41°01′29″N 92°28′09″W

Links
- Public license information: Public file; LMS
- Webcast: Listen Live
- Website: ktwafm.com

KTWA (92.7 FM) is a radio station licensed to serve the community of Ottumwa, Iowa. The station is owned by Greg List, through licensee O-Town Communications, Inc. It airs an adult contemporary music format.

== History ==
The station was assigned the KTWA call letters by the Federal Communications Commission on July 18, 1983. The station has been running an adult contemporary format since the station signed on in December 1984. When the station signed on, it was originally an affiliate of CBS Radio until 1988 when the station subscribed to Satellite Music Network's "Starstation" AC format for several years. Its signal was updated from Class A to Class C3 in December 1990, and in its later years, it was downgraded to C2.
