= KBIZ =

- Ottumwa, Iowa; United States
- Frequency: 1240 kHz
- Branding: 1240 AM & 102.7 FM KBIZ

Programming
- Format: News/talk
- Affiliations: Fox News Radio; Fox Sports Radio; Genesis Communications Network; Premiere Networks; USA Radio Network; Westwood One

Ownership
- Owner: Ottumwa Radio Group; (O-Town Communications, Inc.)
- Sister stations: KLEE, KOTM-FM, KRKN, KKSI, KTWA

History
- First air date: April 15, 1941

Technical information
- Licensing authority: FCC
- Facility ID: 24207
- Class: C
- Power: 1,000 watts unlimited
- Transmitter coordinates: 41°00′00″N 92°23′23″W
- Translator: 102.7 K274CV (Ottumwa)

Links
- Public license information: Public file; LMS
- Webcast: Listen Live
- Website: ottumwaradio.com

KBIZ (1240 AM) is a radio station licensed to serve the community of Ottumwa, Iowa. The station primarily broadcasts a news/talk format. KBIZ is owned by Greg List, through licensee O-Town Communications, Inc.

The application for a U.S. Federal Communications Commission (FCC) construction permit for KBIZ was for 1210 kHz. Before the license was issued in May, 1941 all stations on 1210 kHz had moved to 1240 kHz due to the NARBA agreement.

KBIZ was granted a translator licence by the FCC for an FM simulcast of the AM signal. The FM signal (originally K267BC, now K274CV) began broadcasting in September 2016 at 102.7 FM.

KBIZ carries a mix of local and national programming including the following:
