= Maja Pantić =

Artificial intelligence and robotics researcher

Maja Pantić FREng FIEE
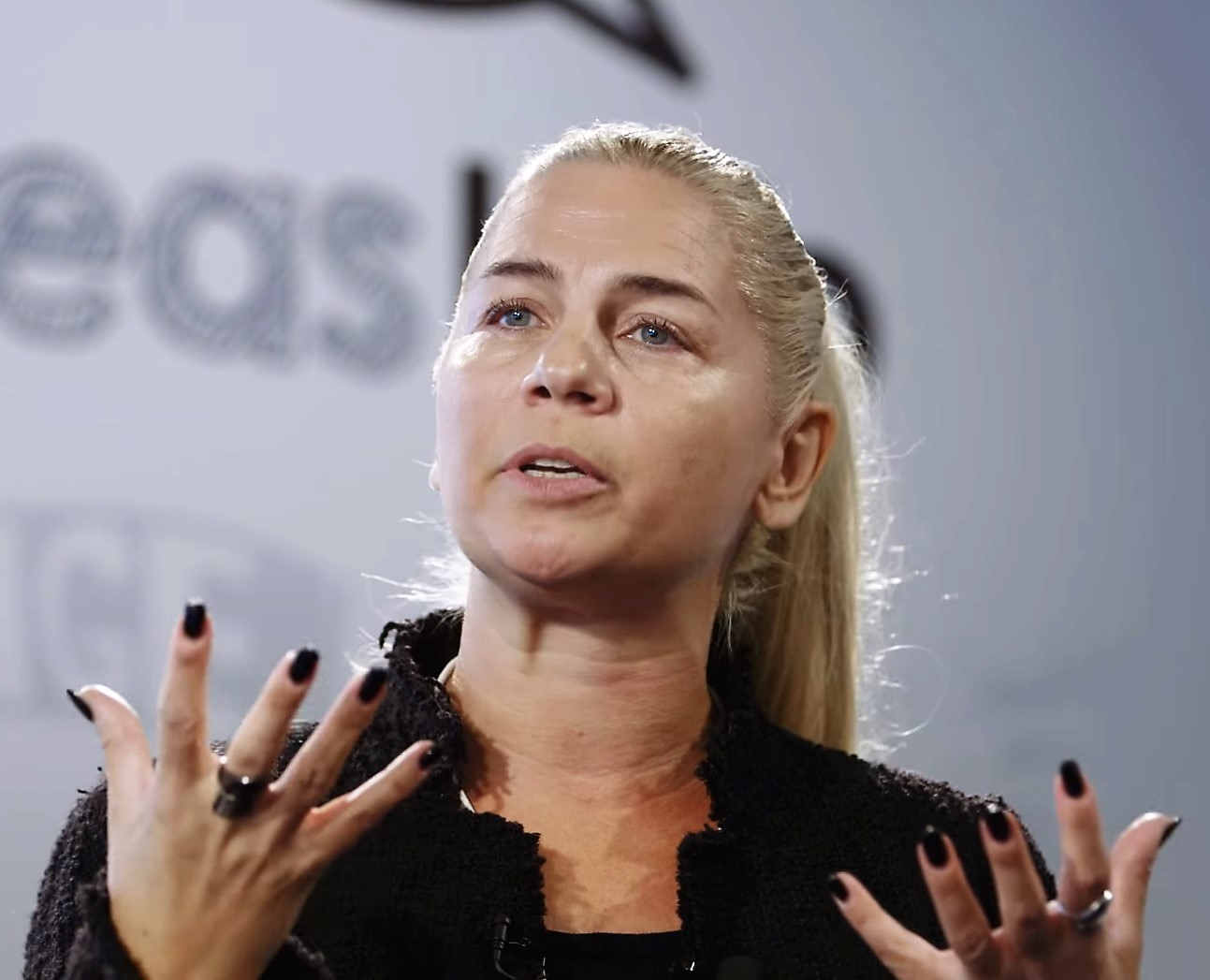
- Pantic speaking at the World Economic Forum in 2016
- Born: 13 April 1970 (age 56); Belgrade
- Education: Delft University of Technology
- Employer(s): Imperial College London; Facebook; University of Twente; Samsung; NatWest Group
- Known for: Artificial Intelligence, Robotics
- Website: ibug.doc.ic.ac.uk/maja

Maja Pantić FREng FIEE (Serbian Cyrillic: Маја Пантић; born 13 April 1970) is a Professor of Affective and Behavioural Computing at Imperial College London and inaugural Chief AI Research Officer at NatWest Group. She was previously Professor of Affective and Behavioural Computing University of Twente, AI Scientific Research Lead in Facebook London, and Research Director of the Samsung AI lab in Cambridge, UK. She is an expert in machine understanding of human behaviour including vision-based detection and tracking of human behavioural cues like facial expressions and body gestures, and multimodal analysis of human behaviours like laughter, social signals and affective states.

== Education ==
Pantić was born in Belgrade, Serbia. She studied mathematics at the University of Belgrade and then moved to the Netherlands in 1992 to study informatics. She received a BSc from Delft University in 1995, followed by an MSc in Artificial Intelligence in 1997. Pantić earned a PhD at the Delft University of Technology, entitled "Facial expression analysis by computational intelligence techniques", in 2001. She was an associate professor at Delft between 2001 and 2005, where she was one of only two women amongst 300 professors in Electronic and Electrical Engineering. In 2002, she was award a Dutch Research Council Junior Fellowship (NWO Veni) and named one of the 7 best young researchers in the Netherlands. In 2005 she joined Takeo Kanade's Face lab in Carnegie Mellon University as a visiting associate professor.

== Research ==
Pantić is an expert on the machine analysis of human nonverbal behaviour. In 2006 she joined Imperial College London's Department of Computing. She published "Artifical [sic] intelligence for Human Computing" with Huang, Pentland and Nijholt in 2007. In 2008 she received European Research Council Starting Grant for her research on Machine Analysis of Human Naturalistic Behavior (MAHNOB). At the time the MAHNOB team started, tools for human behaviour analysis could only handle exaggerated expressions. She was appointed Professor at Imperial College in 2010.

She is head of the Intelligent Behaviour Understanding Group (iBug) group at Imperial College London. In 2012 she presented " Human-centered Computing" at "T100: One Hundred Years from the birth of Alan Turing" at the Royal Society Edinburgh. Pantić is interested in the use of artificial intelligence and machine learning:

- Assisted independent living for the elderly: In 2017 Pantić contributed to the Channel 4 television program "Old People's Home for 4 Year Olds"
- Healthcare
- Autism
- Driverless Cars: In 2017 Pantić contributed to the public discussion about fatal Tesla crash

Professor Pantic has published more than 150 technical papers in the areas of machine analysis of facial expressions, machine analysis of human body gestures, audio-visual analysis of emotions and social signals, and human-centred HCI. She has more than 7300 citations to her work, and has served as the Key Note Speaker, chair and co-chair, and an organisation/program committee member at numerous conferences in areas of expertise.

In 2020, Pantic was made the AI Scientific Research Lead at Facebook London. She left Facebook in December 2024, and moved to NatWest Group as naugural Chief Artificial Intelligence Officer in 2025.

== Recognition and public engagement ==
In 2011 Pantić received the BCS Roger Needham Award. In 2012 Pantić was named Fellow of the Institute of Electrical and Electronics Engineers (IEEE) in 2012 for contribution to automatic human behaviour understanding and affective computing. In 2016 she was named a Fellow of the International Association for Pattern Recognition (IAPR). She is the Editor in Chief of Image and Vision Computing Journal (IVCJ). She is the scientific advisor for Real Eyes. She is on the Strategy and Science Board of Advisors to global market research company IPSOS. In 2019 Pantić was elected a Fellow of the Royal Academy of Engineering.

Pantić regularly talks about her research in National Media. She is an advocate for women in technology. In 2016 she appeared with Charlie Rose on CBS 60 minutes, talking about artificial intelligence and emotion measurement. That year, she was chosen by the journal Nature to present "Machines That Can Read Human Emotions" at the World Economic Forum in Davos. In 2017 she took part in a Guardian Live event, "Brainwaves, How Artificial Intelligence will change the world". In 2018 she expressed concern about the brain drain of AI experts out of academia and into the private sector. However, since then she herself took on a leading role leading Samsung's AI lab in Cambridge, UK, and convincing other academics to join her.

She has said that she imagines AI enhancing human abilities further – allowing for sight, hearing and even communicating to be aided by computers. Eventually, she says that we can imagine that speech itself might be rendered unnecessary if brainwave-to-brainwave transmission, aided by AI, becomes reality.

In 2019 Pantić was elected a Fellow of the Royal Academy of Engineering (FREng).
