= PS-algol =

Orthogonally persistent programming language

- Paradigms: Multi-paradigm: procedural, imperative, structured
- Family: ALGOL
- Designed by: Ron Morrison, Pete Bailey, Fred Brown, Paul Cockshott, Ken Chisholm, Al Dearle
- Developer: University of St Andrews; University of Edinburgh
- First appeared: 1983; 43 years ago
- Implementation language: S-algol
- Platform: ICL mainframe computers

Influenced by
- ALGOL 60, S-algol

Influenced
- Napier88

PS-algol is an orthogonally persistent programming language.

PS-algol was an extension of the language S-algol implemented by the University of St Andrews and the University of Edinburgh, Scotland. S-algol was designed by Ron Morrison and extended by Pete Bailey, Fred Brown, Paul Cockshott, Ken Chisholm, and Al Dearle. These extensions were additional standard functions that provide a persistent heap that survives termination of PS-algol programs.

PS-algol was the world's first fully implemented persistent programming language, and had many users both in academia and, notably, in International Computers Limited (ICL) research labs.

== History ==
PS-algol was conceived by chance, when Ron Morrison was on sabbatical at the University of Edinburgh and met Malcolm Atkinson. Atkinson had been experimenting with persistent programming languages and was struggling to find a coherent model for a persistent Pascal variant. Morrison, whose interest in general-purpose programming had led to the development of S-algol, a general purpose teaching language, realised that S-algol's type system would more easily allow adding orthogonal persistence.

== See also ==
- Flex machine
