= Malcolm Atkinson =

British computer scientist

Malcolm Philip Atkinson
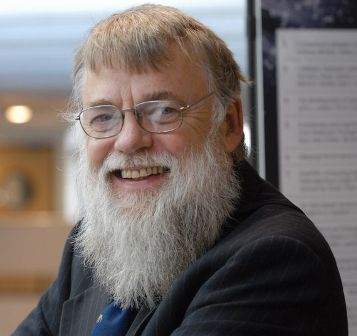
- Malcolm P. Atkinson
- Born: 13 October 1943 (age 82); Cornwall, UK
- Education: University of Cambridge (BA 1966); University of Cambridge (Diploma in Computer Science 1967); University of Cambridge (PhD 1974)
- Scientific career
- Fields: Computer Science e-Science
- Workplaces: University of Edinburgh

Malcolm Phillip Atkinson (born 13 October 1943, Cornwall, UK) is a professor of e-Science, in the University of Edinburgh School of Informatics. He is known for his work in the areas of object-oriented databases, database systems, software engineering and e-Science and was the UK's first e-Science Envoy (2006–2011) and the Director of the e-Science Institute and National e-Science Centre, University of Edinburgh.

== Professional career ==
Atkinson obtained his first degree from the University of Cambridge in 1966, followed by a Diploma in computer science in 1967. After three years research and teaching at Lancaster University he returned to Cambridge and was awarded his PhD in 1974. He then held academic posts in Burma, Cambridge, East Anglia and Edinburgh, being appointed to a senior lectureship at the University of Edinburgh in 1983. He was a visiting professor at the University of Pennsylvania during 1983–84 and was appointed to a professorship in computer science at the University of Glasgow in 1984. He was head of Department of Computing Science from 1986 to 1990, following which he spent nine months on sabbatical at INRIA near Paris working with the O2 group. Atkinson then worked for Sun Microsystems (at SunLabs in California) before moving to the University of Edinburgh in 2001 as Professor in the School of Informatics.

He has more than 100 publications listed on DBLP.

In 1994, he was elected as a fellow in the Royal Society of Edinburgh.

=== UK e-Science envoy ===
A call for applications for the role of e-Science Senior Research Fellow for the e-Science Core Programme was issued by the Engineering & Physical Sciences Research Council (EPSRC) in 2005. Atkinson was the successful candidate and started his work as the e-Science Envoy on 1 April 2006 under EPSRC Grant No EP/D079829/1. Consequently, he stepped down as the director of the UK National e-Science Centre. The director post was taken up by Professor Peter Clarke who held it until August 2009.

=== Director, e-Science Institute ===
He founded the e-Science Institute in August 2001, as a central focus for the e-Science community in the UK. Its mission was to stimulate the creation of new insights in e-Science and computing science by bringing together international experts and enabling them to successfully address significant and diverse challenges.

In January 2007, he appointed Jano van Hemert as Research Leader of the UK National e-Science Centre located at 15 South College Street, Edinburgh, UK. Soon after, they founded the Edinburgh Data-Intensive Research Group. This group became the focus of all e-Science research in the University of Edinburgh. In July 2009, the group joined the Centre for Intelligent Systems and their Applications (CISA) soon after the group had moved into the Informatics Forum. In September 2010, the group merged with the research group of Prof Dave Robertson, then the Head of School of University of Edinburgh School of Informatics.

=== Database research ===
Atkinson has pursued a career working as a researcher in database systems in both academia and industry. Among Atkinson's best known achievements are his influential work on Object-Oriented Database Systems, as presented in the Object-Oriented Database System Manifesto (with François Bancilhon, David DeWitt, Klaus Dittrich, David Maier, and Stanley Zdonik), and his work designing OGSA-DAI, a web-service platform for distributed data access, integration and management used internationally in scientific applications. In the early stages of his career, he worked closely with Carol Linden and Neil Wiseman on the Intermediate Data Language. He identified the value of orthogonal persistence at VLDB in 1978 and led the team that built the first orthogonally persistent programming language, PS-algol, in 1980.

With Norman Paton, Vijay Dialani, Dave Pearson, Tony Storey and Paul Watson, he was a member of the UK Database Task Force which published the blueprint for Database Access and Integration Services to foster a wider activity on the formulation of standards for databases and the Grid. From 2003 to 2008 he served on the steering group of the Open Grid Forum as Data Area Chair. He is co-author of the Web Services Data Access and Integration (WS-DAI) Specification.

He has had a long association with the Very Large Database (VLDB) conference series, and was Programme Committee Chair of VLDB 99. He has been instrumental in setting up the XLDB-Europe series of satellite workshops which identify trends, commonalities and major roadblocks related to building eXtremely Large Data Bases (currently referring to databases whose size is 1 petabyte or greater).

== Biography ==
=== Early years ===
Atkinson was born in East Anglia where his father was in the RAF bomber command, on what is now Stansted Airport. They lived in Wembley for part of the war and after his father was demobbed moved to Flushing in Cornwall where his father managed an Electrical company. His first memory of his home in Cornwall was seeing the sea at the bottom of their garden. He spent a childhood on the beach, bringing seafood home for meals. He had an interest in boats and sailing, first a rowing boat, then an Enterprise sailing dinghy that he built himself and then yachts. On at least one occasion he attempted to rescue people from the sea. He won many prizes as a dinghy sailor. He learned electrics from his father, assisting him connecting farms to the new national grid. They also went down mines and clay-pits to install winding gears. The village school he attended had a single class, and teacher Miss Copp (untrained) was an inspiration to him. She advised his parents that he had the potential to attend the University of Cambridge while young, and also reprimanded him for his early difficulties in writing. He went on to attend Falmouth Grammar, and travelled to school by boat, crossing the Fal Estuary. He contracted rheumatic fever and was unable to attend school for a year during which time he read many science books.

=== University ===
Atkinson got a Scholarship to Cambridge where he read physics. He started in 1962. Having passed everything needed for a first class honours degree by the end of his 2nd year was able to spend his third year on different subjects. He stayed on for a fourth year to do the new Diploma in Computing.

=== Personal ===
He met his first wife Valerie Ross in Cambridge and they were married in 1967. They left Cambridge to start the department of Computer Science at the new Lancaster University and their first daughter, Kirsteen, was born there. Later they had two more daughters, Tamzyn and Janna. Valerie died in 1994. He is married to Kathy Humphry whom he first met in 1978 at the University of Edinburgh where she was a Computing Officer.

=== Miscellaneous events and interests ===
He won "The Scotsman – Innovator of the Year" Prize in 2002, sponsored by Glenfiddich.
