= Ron Morrison =

British computer scientist

- Born: United Kingdom
- Citizenship: United Kingdom
- Education: University of St. Andrews (Ph.D., 1979)
- Known for: Programming languages: S-algol, PS-algol, Napier88; local athletics
- Awards: British Athletics Endurance Official of the Year
- Scientific career
- Fields: Computer science
- Institutions: University of St. Andrews
- Thesis: On the Development of ALGOL (1979)
- Doctoral advisor: Alfred John Cole
- Website: www.st-andrews.ac.uk/computer-science/people/ron

Ron Morrison was the head of School of the computer science department of the University of St. Andrews where he worked on programming languages, inventing S-algol, and coinventing PS-algol and Napier88. He had graduated from St. Andrews with a Doctor of Philosophy (Ph.D.) in 1979. He is also heavily involved with local athletics, coaching the University Cross-Country team, and young, up and coming local athletes. He is a Fellow of the Royal Society of Edinburgh, and the current President of Scottish Athletics.

He retired from St. Andrews in January 2008.

== Selected publications ==
- Morrison, Ron (December 1979). On the Development of Algol (PDF) (PhD). Fife: University of St Andrews.
- Morrison, Ron (1979), S-algol Reference Manual (PDF) (tech report CS/79/1), Fife: University of St Andrews
- Davie, A.J.T.; Morrison, R. (1981), Recursive Descent Compiling, Ellis-Horwood, ISBN 0-470-27270-8
- Cole, A.J.; Morrison, R. (28 January 1983). An introduction to programming with S-algol. Cambridge University Press. ISBN 978-0521250016.
- Atkinson, M.P.; Bailey, P.J.; Chisholm, K.J.; Cockshott, W.P.; Morrison, R. (1983). "PS-algol: A Language for Persistent Programming" (PDF). Proceedings of the 10th Australian National Computer Conference. Melbourne, Australia: 70–79.
- Morrison, R.; Connor, R.C.H.; Cutts, Q.I.; Kirby, G.N.C.; Munro, D.S.; Atkinson, M.P. (1999). "The Napier88 Persistent Programming Language and Environment". In Atkinson, M.P.; Welland, R. (eds.). Fully Integrated Data Environments (PDF). Springer. pp. 98–154. ISBN 3-540-65772-X.

== Coaching and officiating ==
Morrison has coached many athletes, including Andrew Lemoncello and Derek Rae. He received the Endurance Official of the Year award at British Athletics 16th annual Officials Conference in April 2019.
