= Cristian Cadar =

- Education: MIT (BS, MS); Stanford University (PhD)
- Known for: KLEE symbolic execution engine, dynamic symbolic execution
- Awards: Humboldt Research Award (2024); IEEE TCSE New Directions Award (2022); ACM Distinguished Member (2021); BCS Roger Needham Award (2019); SIGOPS Hall of Fame (2018); ERC Consolidator Grant (2018); ACM CCS Test of Time Award (2016)
- Scientific career
- Fields: Software engineering, Symbolic execution, Software reliability
- Workplaces: Imperial College London

Cristian Cadar is a computer scientist and Professor of Software Reliability in the Department of Computing at Imperial College London, where he leads the Software Reliability Group. He is the principal developer and maintainer of the KLEE symbolic execution system and works on automated techniques for finding bugs and security vulnerabilities in software.

== Education and career ==
Cadar received bachelor's degrees in computer science and mathematics and a master's degree from MIT, and his PhD in computer science from Stanford University. He subsequently joined Imperial College London, where he established the Software Reliability Group. He received an EPSRC Early-Career Fellowship in 2013 and an ERC Consolidator Grant in 2018 for the project "PASS: Program Analysis for Safe and Secure Software Evolution".

== Research ==
Cadar's research centres on symbolic execution — a technique that executes programs with symbolic rather than concrete inputs, exploring multiple execution paths simultaneously to automatically discover bugs and generate high-coverage test suites:

- KLEE – an open-source dynamic symbolic execution engine built on top of the LLVM compiler infrastructure; KLEE automatically generates test cases that achieve high code coverage and finds bugs in C/C++ programs; it has been used to test the GNU Coreutils, BusyBox, and hundreds of other open-source projects
- Multi-version execution – running multiple versions of a program simultaneously to detect regressions automatically
- Program analysis for evolving software – techniques for verifying that software changes preserve intended behaviour

== Awards and recognition ==
- Humboldt Research Award (2024)
- IEEE Technical Committee on Software Engineering – New Directions Award (2022, jointly with Abhik Roychoudhury)
- ACM Distinguished Member, for Outstanding Engineering Contributions to Computing (2021)
- BCS Roger Needham Award (2019)
- SIGOPS Hall of Fame Award (2018)
- ERC Consolidator Grant (2018)
- HVC Award (2017)
- ACM Computer and Communications Security (CCS) Test of Time Award (2016)
- BCS Fellowship (2016)
- Jochen Liedtke Young Researcher Award (EuroSys, 2015)
- EPSRC Early-Career Fellowship (2013)
