= Artificial Intelligence Applications Institute =

Artificial Intelligence research

- Established: 1983
- Research type: Research institute
- Field of research: Artificial intelligence, Artificial Intelligence Programming systems, Knowledge-based systems, Decision support systems, Planning
- Founding Director: Jim Howe
- Location: Edinburgh, Scotland
- Website: www.aiai.ed.ac.uk

The Artificial Intelligence Applications Institute (AIAI) at the School of Informatics at the University of Edinburgh was a non-profit technology transfer organisation that promoted research in the field of artificial intelligence.

== History ==
The Artificial Intelligence Applications Institute (AIAI) was founded in 1983 at the University of Edinburgh as a specialist research and technology-transfer unit focusing on the practical uses of artificial intelligence (AI). The institute was established by Professor Jim Howe and colleagues from the Science and Engineering Research Council (SERC) Special Interest Group in AI in the Department of Artificial Intelligence, with a mission to apply AI techniques to solve real-world industrial and governmental problems.

AIAI became one of the leading UK research centres devoted to AI programming systems, intelligent planning systems, decision support, and knowledge-based engineering. It collaborated with both academic partners and international organisations. AIAI joined the newly created Centre for Intelligent Systems and their Applications (CISA) within the University's School of Informatics. In December 2019, the combined organisation was renamed the Artificial Intelligence and its Applications Institute to reflect a broader integration of fundamental and applied AI research.

== Research programmes ==
AIAI’s research spans multiple areas of artificial intelligence, including:

- AI programming Systems - Edinburgh Prolog, Edinburgh Common Lisp, Logo;
- Knowledge representation and reasoning – development of ontologies, rule-based inference, and semantic modelling;
- Automated planning and scheduling – intelligent task management systems used in aerospace, manufacturing, and emergency response;
- Natural language processing and intelligent agents – interaction frameworks for human–computer collaboration;
- AI ethics and decision-making – research into responsible deployment and evaluation of autonomous systems.

The institute also contributes to interdisciplinary fields such as computational creativity, explainable AI, and human–AI interaction. AIAI maintains close collaboration with the Bayes Centre and the Alan Turing Institute through joint research programmes and doctoral training initiatives.

== Technology transfer and impact ==
From its inception, AIAI has combined academic research with technology-transfer activity, offering professional training, industrial consultancy, and bespoke software systems.
