= KOTM-FM =

- Ottumwa, Iowa; United States
- Frequency: 97.7 MHz
- Branding: TOM FM 97.7

Programming
- Format: Top 40 (CHR)

Ownership
- Owner: Ottumwa Radio Group; (O-Town Communications, Inc.)
- Sister stations: KLEE, KBIZ, KRKN, KKSI, KTWA

History
- First air date: January 19, 1976
- Former call signs: KLEE-FM (1976–1986)
- Call sign meaning: Ottumwa

Technical information
- Class: C3
- ERP: 19,000 watts
- HAAT: 112 meters
- Transmitter coordinates: 41°01′28″N 92°28′56″W

Links
- Webcast: Listen Live!
- Website: ottumwaradio.com/97-7-tom-fm/

KOTM-FM (97.7 MHz, "97.7 Tom FM") is a radio station broadcasting a Top 40 (CHR) format serving Ottumwa, Iowa. The station is currently owned by Greg List, through licensee O-Town Communications, Inc.

== History ==
former KOTM logo

KLEE-FM signed on the air on the morning of January 19, 1976 featuring a mix of MOR music during the day and simulcasts of its then-Top 40 sister station KLEE-AM at night. Right after KLEE-AM dropped its Top 40 format in 1981, its previous Top 40 format moved to KLEE-FM and went under the branding name of "K98". On June 28, 1986, its call letters were changed to KOTM.

On March 2, 2009, KOTM rebranded from "97.7 KOTM" to "97.7 Tom FM" to prevent confusion of the KOTM call letters, which stand for Otumwa. The new branding was named after Tom Palen, the owner was FMC Broadcasting Inc. at the time of the change.
