= Ian Foster (computer scientist) =

New Zealand-American computer scientist

- Born: 1 January 1959 (age 67); Wellington, New Zealand
- Education: University of Canterbury; Imperial College London (PhD)
- Known for: Strand; Grid Computing; Globus Toolkit; Globus service
- Awards: Lovelace Medal (2002); Gordon Bell Prize; Tsutomu Kanai Award (2011); Charles Babbage Award (2019)
- Scientific career
- Fields: Computer Science; Grid computing
- Workplaces: University of Chicago; Argonne National Laboratory
- Thesis: Parlog as a systems programming language (1988)
- Doctoral advisor: Keith Clark
- Website: ianfoster.typepad.com; www.cs.uchicago.edu/directory/ian-foster; labs.globus.org

Ian Tremere Foster (born 1 January 1959) is a New Zealand-American computer scientist. He is a distinguished fellow, senior scientist, and director of the Data Science and Learning division at Argonne National Laboratory, and a professor in the department of computer science at the University of Chicago.

== Education and career ==
Foster was born in Wellington, New Zealand, in 1959. He was educated at Wellington College and the University of Canterbury, followed by the Department of Computing, Imperial College London.

From 2006 to 2016, he was director of the Computation Institute (CI), a joint project between the University of Chicago, and Argonne National Laboratory. CI brings together computational scientists and discipline leaders to work on projects with computation as a key component.

He is currently Director of the Data Science and Learning Division at Argonne National Laboratory, a unit established to tackle advanced scientific problems where data analysis and artificial intelligence can provide critical insights and accelerate discovery.

== Honors ==
Foster's honours include the Gordon Bell Prize for high-performance computing (2001), the Lovelace Medal of the British Computer Society (2002), an honorary Doctor of Science from the University of Canterbury in 2005, the IEEE Tsutomu Kanai Award (2011), the IEEE Computer Society Charles Babbage Award, (with Carl Kesselman) the IEEE Computer Society Harry H Goode Memorial Award (2020), the IEEE Internet Award (2023), (Note: Alongside Carl Kesselman; the citation reads: "For contributions to the design, deployment, and application of practical Internet-scale global computing platforms.) and the ACM-IEEE CS Ken Kennedy Award (2022). He was elected Fellow of the British Computer Society in 2001, Fellow of the American Association for the Advancement of Science in 2003, and in 2009, a Fellow of the Association for Computing Machinery, who named him the inaugural recipient of the high-performance parallel and distributed computing (HPDC) achievement award in 2012. In 2017, he was recognised with the Euro-Par Achievement Award.

== Research ==
Foster's research focuses on the acceleration of discovery in a network using distributed computing. With Carl Kesselman and Steve Tuecke, Foster coined the term grid computing: techniques for data-intensive, multi-institution collaboration that paved the way for cloud computing. Methods and software developed under his leadership advanced discovery in areas as high energy physics, environmental science, and biomedicine.

For example, grid computing was credited by CERN director Rolf-Dieter Heuer as one of the elements essential for the 2012 discovery of the Higgs boson.

His research has also resulted in the development of techniques, tools and algorithms for high-performance distributed computing and parallel computing. His Globus Toolkit project encouraged collaborative computing for engineering, business and other fields. In March 2004, Foster co-founded Univa Corporation to commercialize the technology.

== Publications ==
- Strand: New Concepts for Parallel Programming. Prentice Hall, 1990.
- Designing and Building Parallel Programs. Addison-Wesley, 1994.
- The Grid: Blueprint for a New Computing Infrastructure. Morgan Kaufmann, 1998.
- The Sourcebook of Parallel Computing. Morgan Kaufmann, 2003.
- The Grid 2, Second Edition: Blueprint for a New Computing Infrastructure. Elsevier, 2004.
- Big Data and Social Science . CRC Press, 2016.
- Cloud Computing for Science and Engineering. MIT Press, November 2017.

== See also ==
- List of honorary doctors of the University of Canterbury
