= Wenfei Fan =

Chinese-British computer scientist

Wenfei Fan FRS FREng FRSE MAE
- 樊文飞
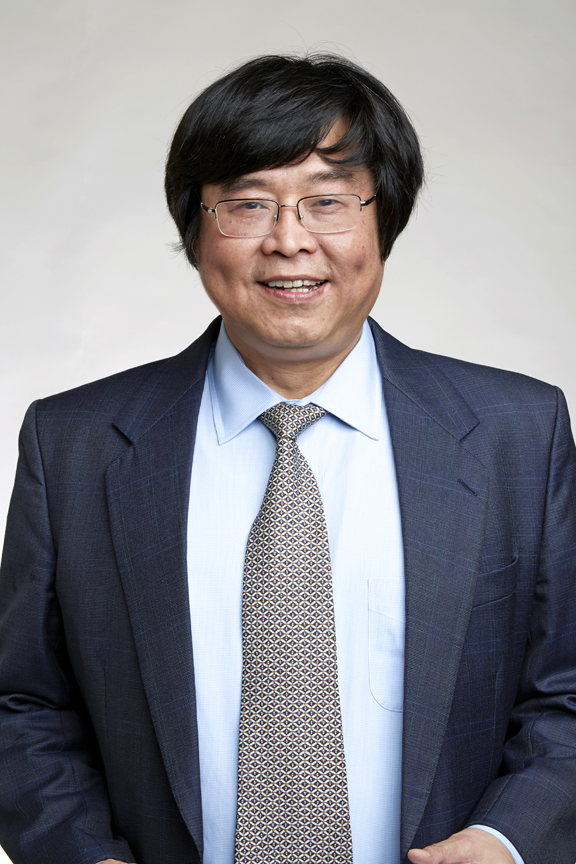
- Fan in 2018
- Education: Peking University (BS, MS); University of Pennsylvania (PhD)
- Awards: Royal Society Wolfson Research Merit Award (2018); ACM Fellow (2012); Roger Needham Award (2008)
- Scientific career
- Fields: Databases
- Workplaces: University of Edinburgh; Beihang University
- Thesis: Path Constraints for Databases with or without Schemas (1999)
- Doctoral advisor: Peter Buneman; Scott Weinstein
- Website: homepages.inf.ed.ac.uk/wenfei

Wenfei Fan (Chinese: 樊文飞; pinyin: Fán Wénfēi) is a Chinese-British computer scientist and professor of web data management at the University of Edinburgh. His research investigates database theory and database systems.

== Education ==
Fan was educated at Peking University (BS, MS) and the University of Pennsylvania where he was awarded a PhD in Computer Science for research supervised by Peter Buneman and Scott Weinstein in 1999.

== Career and research ==
After his Ph.D. in 1999, he remained in the USA but joined University of Edinburgh in 2004 as a Reader. In 2006, he became Professor of Web Data Management at the university.

Fan has made fundamental contributions to both theory and practice of data management. He has both formalised the problems of querying big data and has developed radically new techniques that overcome the limits associated with conventional database systems. His work has been adopted in the telecommunications industry for analyzing massive data sets that defied their current technology. In addition, Fan has made seminal contributions to data quality, in which he devised new techniques for data cleaning that have found wide commercial adoption. He has also contributed to our understanding of semi-structured data.

=== Awards and honors ===
Fan won the Roger Needham Award in 2008 and is a Fellow of the Royal Society, Fellow of the Royal Academy of Engineering, a Fellow of the Royal Society of Edinburgh, a Foreign member of the Chinese Academy of Sciences, a Fellow of the Association for Computing Machinery (ACM)., and a member of Academia Europaea (MAE).

- Fellow of the Royal Academy of Engineering(FREng), 2023.
- Foreign member of the Chinese Academy of Sciences, 2019.
- Fellow of the Royal Society (FRS), 2018.
- Royal Society Wolfson Research Merit Award (2018)
- 20 17 SIGMOD Research Highlight Award (2018)
- Best Paper Award for SIGMOD 2017
- VLDB conference 2017 Best Demo Award
- European Research Council (ERC) Advanced Fellowship, 2015
- Alberto O. Mendelzon Test-of-Time Award for ACM PODS 2015
- ACM Fellow, 2012
- Fellow of the Royal Society of Edinburgh (FRSE), 2011
- National Professor of the Thousand-Talent Program, 2010, China
- Alberto O. Mendelzon Test-of-Time Award for ACM PODS 2010
- Best Paper Award at the VLDB conference 2010
- The Roger Needham Award, 2008, UK
- Best Paper Award for ICDE 2007
- Changjiang Scholar, 2007, China
- Best Paper of the Year Award for Computer Networks, 2002
- The Career Award, 2001, USA
