= Helen Hastie =

AI and robotics researcher

- Born: Helen Hastie
- Education: Centre of Speech Technology Research Georgetown University Edinburgh University
- Occupation: Professor in computer science — robotic ai researcher
- Known for: Head of the School of Informatics at the University of Edinburgh, RAEng/Leverhulme Trust Senior Research Fellow
- Scientific career
- Fields: computer science
- Workplaces: University of Edinburgh
- Thesis: Modelling prosodic and dialogue information for automatic speech recognition.

Helen Hastie is the Head of the School of Informatics of the University of Edinburgh and a RAEng/Leverhulme Trust Senior Research Fellow. She specialises in Human-Robot Interaction and Multimodal interfaces. Hastie has undertaken projects such as AI personal assistants for remote robots, autonomous systems and spoken dialogue systems for sectors in defence and energy. She is a Fellow of the Royal Society of Edinburgh.

== Education ==
In 1995, Hastie graduated with a M.A. in Linguistics from the University of Edinburgh. Following this in 1996 she graduated with MS in Computational Linguistics from Georgetown University.

Additionally in 2000, Hastie graduated from the University of Edinburgh with a PhD. in "Modelling Prosodic and Dialogue Information for Automatic Speech Recognition". Furthermore, in 2013 Hastie graduated with a PGCAP (Postgraduate Certificate in Academic Practice) from Heriot-Watt University.

== Career ==
In 1997, Hastie joined the University of Edinburgh as a research associate and tutor in which she taught modules such as Interaction Design, Web Design and Databases and Research Methods.

During 2001, Hastie joined AT&T Research Laboratories as a research associate before leaving in 2002 to become the lead engineering member for Lockheed Martin's Advanced Technology laboratories, where in 2005 she was promoted to senior member.

In January 2008, Hastie became a research fellow for the department of informatics for the University of Edinburgh.

During 2009, Hastie joined Heriot-Watt University as an associate professor in computer science, where she was promoted to lecturer in October 2013 and still an active lecturer.

In September 2022, serving as the academic lead, Hastie aided in opening the Heriot-Watt University's National Robotarium. Based in Edinburgh, the centre worth 22.4m GBP, was built for the focus of robotics and artificial intelligence research. The center is the largest applied research facility for robotics and AI systems in the UK.

In May 2023, she was appointed as the new Head of the School of Informatics of the University of Edinburgh, taking over from Professor Jane Hillston in August of that same year.

== Media representation ==
In July 2022, Hastie gave an interview to The Scotsman on the topic of human and robot relationships. Hastie discusses the challenges that comes with creating an emotionally intelligent machine that can build relationships and trust between the machine with there users. Hastie discusses the different scientific fields needed to build such relationships including, robotics, cognitive science, and psychology and how these fields are used to build a cognitive AI model.

During October 2022, Hastie was interviewed by the BBC on the topic of humanoid robots, specifically Tesla's humanoid robot Optimus. During the interview, Hastie noted that the work required for humanoid locomotion alone is difficult compared to wheels or quadruped locomotion. Additionally she stated that creating a humanoid robot can be detrimental and off putting to the users themselves. However, in response to the criticisms of the Optimus, she stated that the most important thing is that it is built for the use cases they will be required for.

== Awards and recognition ==
In 2022, RO-MAN named Hastie's paper "We are all Individuals: The Role of Robot Personality and Human Traits in Trustworthy Interaction" KROS Interdisciplinary Research Award in Social Human-Robot Interaction. In 2022 Hastie was named a fellow of the Royal Society of Edinburgh.
