= Frank Keller =

- Education: University of Stuttgart (MA); University of Edinburgh (PhD)
- Scientific career
- Fields: Computational linguistics; Psycholinguistics; Cognitive modeling; Natural language processing
- Workplaces: University of Edinburgh
- Thesis: Gradience in Grammar: Experimental and Computational Aspects of Degrees of Grammaticality (2001)
- Doctoral advisors: Mark Steedman
- Website: homepages.inf.ed.ac.uk/keller/

Frank Keller is a professor of computational cognition at the School of Informatics, University of Edinburgh and director at the Institute for Language, Cognition and Computation.

Keller got his B.S. from the University of Stuttgart and then got his Ph.D. from the University of Edinburgh. He then served as postdoc at Saarland University and Massachusetts Institute of Technology, before managing European Network on Vision and Language Committee and serving as a member of the European Association for Computational Linguistics' governing board.
