= Jim Howe =

Australian rules footballer

Personal information
- Full name: Jim Howe
- Born: 7 November 1895
- Died: 28 December 1958 (aged 63)
- Original team: Teacher's Training College

Playing career^{1}
Years	Club	Games (Goals)
1918–19	Carlton	8 (2)
- ^{1} Playing statistics correct to the end of 1919.

Jim Howe (7 November 1895 – 28 December 1958) was an Australian rules footballer who played with Carlton in the Victorian Football League (VFL).
