= Alex Lascarides =

British linguist and academic

Alex Lascarides FRSE
- Born: Alexandra Lascarides
- Education: Durham University (BSc); University of Edinburgh (MSc, PhD)
- Scientific career
- Fields: Computational Linguistics; Semantics; Pragmatics
- Workplaces: University of Edinburgh
- Thesis: A formal semantic analysis of the progressive (1988)
- Doctoral advisor: Barry Richards
- Website: homepages.inf.ed.ac.uk/alex

Alexandra Lascarides is a linguist and chair in Semantics in the School of Informatics at the University of Edinburgh. Her research investigates computational linguistics and artificial intelligence.

== Early life and education ==
Lascarides graduated from Durham University where she was a student of Van Mildert College, Durham with a first-class degree in mathematics. She moved to the University of Edinburgh for her graduate studies, earning a master's degree in cognitive science in 1985. She stayed at Edinburgh for her doctoral research on semantic analysis.

== Research and career ==
Her research investigates the semantics of communicative actions in conversation. She explored the science of conversation in the Logics of Conversation, and presented a framework known as Segmented Discourse Representation Theory to better understand linguistics and language.

=== Select publications ===
- Asher, Nicholas; Lascarides, Alex (2003). Logics of conversation. Cambridge: Cambridge University Press. ISBN 0-521-65058-5. OCLC 51607413.
- Lascarides, Alex; Asher, Nicholas (1993-10-01). "Temporal interpretation, discourse relations and commonsense entailment". Linguistics and Philosophy. 16 (5): 437–493. doi:10.1007/BF00986208. ISSN 1573-0549.
- Asher, N; Lascarides, Alex (1998-02-01). "Bridging". Journal of Semantics. 15 (1): 83–113. doi:10.1093/jos/15.1.83. ISSN 0167-5133.
- Asher, N; Lascarides, Alex (1998-08-01). "The semantics and pragmatics of presupposition". Journal of Semantics. 15 (3): 239–300. doi:10.1093/jos/15.3.239. ISSN 0167-5133.

=== Awards and honours ===
In 2023 she was elected Fellow of the Royal Society of Edinburgh (FRSE).
