= Byron Cook (computer scientist) =

Dr. Byron Cook
- Occupation: computer science researcher
- Known for: Termination analysis

Dr. Byron Cook is an American computer science researcher at University College London. Byron's research interests include program analysis/verification, programming languages, theorem proving, logic, hardware design, and operating systems. Byron's recent work has been focused on the development of automatic tools for

- Proving properties of biological models,
- Termination and liveness proving, and
- Discovering invariants regarding mutable data structures.

== Awards and Prizes ==
In 2009, Cook won the Roger Needham Award. His public lecture was on "Proving that programs eventually do something good".

Cook was elected as a Fellow of the Royal Academy of Engineering in 2019.
