= Quantum (journal) =

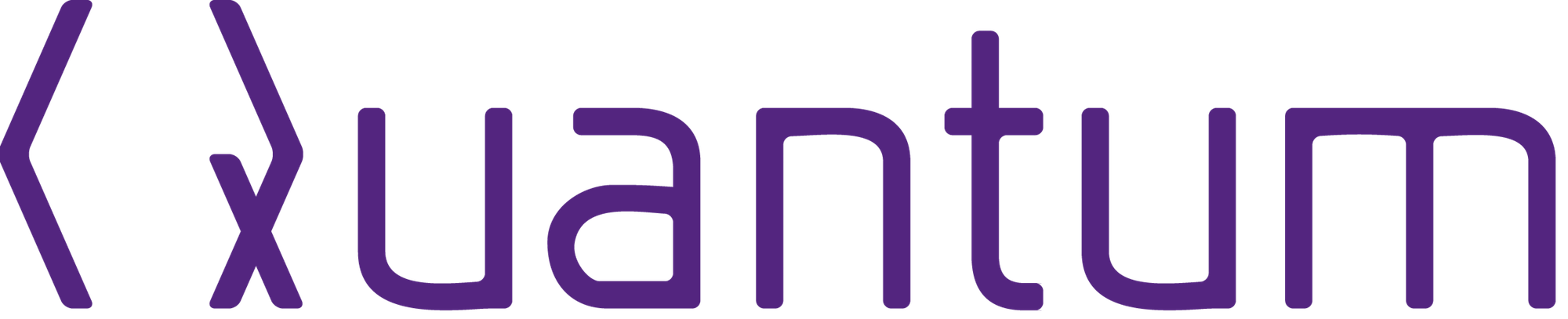
- Discipline: Quantum science
- Language: English

Publication details
- History: 2017–present
- Publisher: Verein zur Förderung des Open Access Publizierens in den Quantenwissenschaften
- Open access: Yes
- License: CC BY 4.0
- Impact factor: 6.777 (2021)

Standard abbreviations
- ISO 4: Quantum

Indexing
- ISSN: 2521-327X (print); 2521-327X (web)

Links
- Journal homepage

Quantum is an online-only, open-access, peer-reviewed scientific journal for quantum science and related fields. The journal was established in 2017. Quantum is an arXiv overlay journal, meaning the journal's content is hosted on the arXiv.

Quantum is listed in the Directory of Open Access Journals and the Emerging Sources Citation Index, and it is recognized by the European Physical Society as maintaining a high standard of peer review.

== See also ==
- Discrete Analysis
