= KLEE =

- Ottumwa, Iowa; United States
- Frequency: 1480 kHz
- Branding: 107.7 FM & 1480 AM KLEE

Programming
- Format: Oldies

Ownership
- Owner: Linder Radio Group, Ottumwa Radio Group; (O-Town Communications, Inc.)
- Sister stations: KOTM-FM, KBIZ, KRKN, KKSI, KTWA

History
- First air date: 1954

Technical information
- Licensing authority: FCC
- Facility ID: 21915
- Class: D
- Power: 250 watts (daytime); 17 watts (nighttime)
- Transmitter coordinates: 41°1′28″N 92°28′56″W
- Translator: 107.7 K299BA (Ottumwa)

Links
- Public license information: Public file; LMS
- Webcast: Listen Live
- Website: KLEE Online

KLEE (1480 AM) is a commercial radio station serving the Ottumwa, Iowa area. The station primarily broadcasts an oldies format. KLEE is licensed to O-Town Communications, Inc., owned by Greg List. O-Town Communications has applied for an FM translator for KLEE. The translator (K299BA) went on-air on October 28, 2014, on 107.7 MHz.

== See also ==
- KILT (AM), which used the callsign KLEE from 1948 to 1954.
- KPRC-TV, which formerly broadcast television as KLEE-TV.
