= Carl Kesselman =

American computer scientist

Carl Kesselman is an American computer scientist specializing in grid computing technologies. This term was developed by him and professor Ian Foster in the book The Grid: Blueprint for a New Computing Infrastructure. He and Foster are winners of the British Computer Society's Lovelace Medal for their grid work. He is institute fellow at the University of Southern California's Information Sciences Institute and a professor in the Epstein Department of Industrial and Systems Engineering, at the University of Southern California.

Kesselman co-led the Globus Toolkit project, core technologies for computational grid systems in the areas of resource location, resource allocation, computer security, data communication, and data access. He described a Globus testbed called GUSTO in 1997.

He was elected as an ACM Fellow in 2017 and was awarded (with Ian Foster) the IEEE Computer Society Harry H Goode Memorial Award (2020) and IEEE Internet Award (2023).

He received a PhD in computer science from UCLA in 1991.
