= Sharon Goldwater =

American and British natural language processing researcher

Sharon J. Goldwater is an American and British computer scientist, cognitive scientist, developmental linguist, and natural language processing researcher who holds the Personal Chair of Computational Language Learning in the University of Edinburgh School of Informatics. Her research involves the unsupervised learning of language by computers, and computer modeling of language development in children.

== Education and career ==
Goldwater is a 1998 graduate of Brown University, and worked as a researcher at SRI International from 1998 to 2000. She then returned to Brown for graduate study in cognitive and linguistic sciences, completing her Ph.D. in 2006. Her dissertation, Nonparametric Bayesian Models of Lexical Acquisition, was supervised by Mark Johnson.

After postdoctoral research at Stanford University, she took her present position at the University of Edinburgh. She was given a personal chair in 2018.

== Recognition ==
Goldwater was the 2016 winner of the Roger Needham Award of the British Computer Society.
