= Neonatal bowel obstruction =

Blockage of the intestines in children

Neonatal Bowel obstruction
- Other names: Neonatal intestinal obstruction
- Specialty: Neonatology

Neonatal bowel obstruction (NBO) or neonatal intestinal obstruction is the most common surgical emergency in the neonatal period. It may occur due to a variety of conditions and has an excellent outcome based on timely diagnosis and appropriate intervention.

== Presentation ==
The neonatal bowel obstruction is suspected based on polyhydramnios in utero, bilious vomiting, failure to pass meconium in the first day of life, and abdominal distension. The presentations of NBO may vary. It may be subtle and easily overlooked on physical examination or can involve massive abdominal distension, respiratory distress and cardiovascular collapse. Unlike older children, neonates with unrecognized intestinal obstruction deteriorate rapidly.

== Diagnosis ==
Neonatal bowel obstruction is grouped into two general categories: high, or proximal, obstruction and low, or distal obstruction, both of which are suspected by failure to pass meconium at birth. High obstruction can be suspected based on the double bubble sign. Cases without distal gas are usually related to duodenal atresia, while high obstruction with distal gas need an upper gastrointestinal series because of the need to distinguish duodenal web, duodenal stenosis and annular pancreas from midgut volvulus, the latter being a surgical emergency. Confirmation is ultimately by surgical intervention.

A low obstruction is suspected on plain film, but needs follow up with a gastrografin enema, which itself can be therapeutic. The differential for low obstruction is ileal atresia, meconium ileus, meconium plug syndrome and Hirschsprung disease. In cases of meconium ileus or ileal atresia, the colon distal to the obstruction is hypoplastic, usually less than 1 cm in caliber, as development of normal colonic caliber in utero is due to the passage of meconium, which does not occur in either of these conditions. When diffusely small caliber is seen, it is referred to as microcolon. Radiographs in meconium ileus classically demonstrate a bubbly appearance in the right lower quadrant due to a combination of ingested air and meconium. If, on contrast enema, reflux into the dilated distal small bowel loops can be achieved, the study is both diagnostic and therapeutic, as the ionic contrast medium can dissolve the meconium to allow passage of enteric content into the unused colon.

If contrast cannot be refluxed into the distal small bowel, ileal atresia remains a diagnostic possibility.

== Treatment ==
Jejunal and ileal atresia are caused by in utero vascular insults, leading to poor recanalization of distal small bowel segments, a condition in which surgical resection and reanastamosis are mandatory. Hirschsprung disease is due to an arrest in neural cell ganglia, leading to absent innervation of a segment distal bowel, and appears as a massively dilated segment of distal bowel on contrast enema. Surgical resection is necessary for this condition as well. Imperforate anus also requires surgical management, with the diagnosis made by inability to pass the rectal tube through the anal sphincter. Supportive intravenous hydration, gastric decompression, and ventilatory support may be needed due to poor neonatal nutrition resulting from dysfunctional bowel absorption.

== Prognosis ==
With early intervention, morbidity and mortality of cases of intestinal obstruction is low. The outcome is in part dependent upon congenital comorbidities and delays in diagnosis and management.

== Epidemiology ==
It has an estimated incidence of about 1 in 2000 live births.
