= Megaduodenum =

- Other names: Hereditary hollow visceral myopathy
- Specialty: Gastroenterology

Megaduodenum is a congenital or acquired dilation and elongation of the duodenum with hypertrophy of all layers that presents as a feeling of gastric fullness, abdominal pain, belching, heartburn, and nausea with vomiting sometimes of food eaten 24 hours prior.

Megaduodenum does not let the muscles of the duodenum function properly, the movement of waste material in the intestines gets impaired, which in turn affects digestion and nutrition.

This condition is a rare entity in adults, because it may be either primary idiopathic or secondary. The secondary causes include Chagas disease, systematic sclerosis, duodenal stenosis, and visceral myopathy.

== Signs and symptoms ==
The signs of duodenum can vary amongst patients. A high rate of chromosomal damage found in blood lymphocytes can indicate the presence of megaduodenum.

Signs and symptoms include:

- Dilated Duodenum
- Abdominal distention
- Nausea
- Vomiting and diarrhea
- Severe digestive pseudo-obstruction
- Recurrent urinary retention
- Vacuolar degeneration and fibrosis of the longitudinal layer of gastrointestinal muscle.

It is possible that this disease can be misdiagnosed and mimic other intestinal disorders, or later increase the chances of becoming a tumor.

== Causes ==
Although environmental factors can play a role in the development of Megaduodenum, genetic factors are responsible for creating tumors. Therefore, many complications of chromosomal damage in the blood lymphocytes can be possible causes. However, the main causes are:

- Annular pancreas
- Adhesions
- Systemic sclerosis
- Superior mesenteric artery syndrome
- Aneurysm.
- Duodenal atresia

Megaduodenum due to its duodenal ganglionitis is an unusual condition, Megaduodenum's similarity to megacolon and megaesophagus diseases can better explain the most plausible causes of it. In addition, some theories state that megaduodenum can be associated with the following causes: post-vagotomy, vitamin deficiency, and collagen diseases.

== Mechanism/Pathophysiology ==
Megaduodenum can be passed down through families, it occurs when a patient inherits one copy of a muted megaduodenum gene from one parent. When the gene gets interrupted in the cells, it causes tumors.

Acute pancreatitis, adhesions, aneurysm all clinically lead to Megaduodenum.

== Diagnosis ==
Upper Endoscopy

Diagnostic tests and procedures can vary for different types of intestinal disorders. These can include colonoscopy, upper GI endoscopy, capsule endoscopy, endoscopic ultrasound. Since patients with megaduodenum often have atypical symptoms such as hematemesis, steatorrhea, and acute pancreatitis. Therefore, physical and histological examination helps demonstrate the grade of distention and the nutritional status of the patient. Many of the physical examinations include: blood pressure, bowel sounds, blood tests, and thyroid function. In addition, a histological examination such as upper endoscopy, an X-ray of the abdomen, and biopsies can also be performed to diagnose megaduodenum efficiently.

== Prevention/Treatment ==
The treatment mainly depends on the underlying conditions and the degree of distention of the duodenum. It can be symptomatic and based on diet and control of bacterial overgrowth. To relieve the obstructive symptoms, latero-lateral duodenojejunostomy, gastrojejunostomy, duodenal-jejunal bypass (DJB), enteral and parenteral nutrition may be helpful. Therefore, early diagnosis and treatment may improve patient's outcome and reduce morbidity.

Diagram showing laparoscopic surgery.

== Prognosis ==
As long as Megaduodenum is treated promptly, the chances of making full recovery is possible. Posturing maneuvers during meals may be helpful in some patients, also to relieve any compression of the duodenum the patient may lie down in right decubitus position. If the conservative treatments fail, surgery may be performed. Some of the surgeries may include duodenojejunostomy, laparoscopic duodenojejunostomy, or laparoscopic surgery.

The timeline for recovery is 7 weeks.

== Epidemiology ==
No statistical information has been identified. Megaduodenum is an uncommon disease, and because of its extreme rarity of the condition only few cases has been reported in the literatures.

== Current Research ==
Since Megaduodenum is a rare disease, treatments and decisions are made based on the patients initial conditions and their responses to the provided treatments or surgeries.

There are currently several ongoing clinical trials for megaduodenum. One study involves research of idiopathic megaduodenum in children which is a rare condition. The purpose of this study is to present the management of idiopathic megaduodenum in children.
