= Centromere protein F =

Centromere- and microtubule-associated protein

CENPF

Identifiers
- Aliases: CENPF, CENF, PRO1779, hcp-1, CILD31, STROMS, centromere protein F
- External IDs: OMIM: 600236; MGI: 1313302; GeneCards: CENPF

Gene location (Human)
Chr.	Chromosome 1 (human)
Band	1q41	Start	214,603,195 bp
Band	1q41	End	214,664,571 bp

Gene location (Mouse)
Chr.	Chromosome 1 (mouse)
Band	1 H6|1 95.03 cM	Start	189,372,803 bp
Band	1 H6|1 95.03 cM	End	189,420,283 bp
RNA expression pattern
Bgee	Human / Mouse (ortholog); Top expressed in: ventricular zone; ganglionic eminence; gonad; testicle; trabecular bone; stromal cell of endometrium; bone marrow; bone marrow cell; mucosa of transverse colon; left testis / Top expressed in: zygote; primary oocyte; tail of embryo; genital tubercle; maxillary prominence; ventricular zone; secondary oocyte; fetal liver hematopoietic progenitor cell; superior cervical ganglion; mandibular prominence; More reference expression data
BioGPS	n/a
Gene ontology
Molecular function	protein homodimerization activity; transcription factor binding; chromatin binding; protein C-terminus binding; protein binding; dynein complex binding
Cellular component	cytoplasm; ciliary basal body; cytosol; centrosome; spindle pole; nuclear envelope; nuclear matrix; spindle; nucleoplasm; ciliary transition fiber; chromosome; midbody; outer kinetochore; perinuclear region of cytoplasm; pronucleus; axoneme; chromatin; chromosome, centromeric region; cytoskeleton; nucleus; kinetochore
Biological process	regulation of G2/M transition of mitotic cell cycle; regulation of striated muscle tissue development; cell differentiation; metaphase plate congression; DNA biosynthetic process; kidney development; chromosome segregation; muscle organ development; ventricular system development; mitotic spindle assembly checkpoint signaling; regulation of cell cycle; cell division; multicellular organism development; protein transport; cell cycle; cell population proliferation; negative regulation of transcription, DNA-templated; kinetochore assembly; mitotic cell cycle
Sources:Amigo / QuickGO
Orthologs
Databases	NCBI: entry; OMA: entry
Species	Human	Mouse
Entrez	1063	108000
Ensembl	ENSG00000117724	ENSMUSG00000026605
UniProt	P49454	n/a
RefSeq (mRNA)	NM_016343	NM_001081363
RefSeq (protein)	NP_057427	n/a
Location (UCSC)	Chr 1: 214.6 – 214.66 Mb	Chr 1: 189.37 – 189.42 Mb
PubMed search
- Wikidata
View/Edit Human	View/Edit Mouse

Centromere protein F is a protein that in humans is encoded by the CENPF gene. It is involved in chromosome segregation during cell division. It also has a role in the orientation of microtubules to form cellular cilia.

== Function ==
CENPF is part of the nuclear matrix during the G2 phase of the cell cycle (the phase of rapid protein synthesis in preparation for mitosis). In late G2, the protein forms part of the kinetochore, a disc-shaped protein complex that allows the centromere of two sister chromatids to attach to microtubules (forming the spindle apparatus) in order for the microtubules to pull them apart in the process of dividing the cell. It remains part of the kinetochore through early anaphase (the chromosome-dividing phase). In late anaphase, CENPF localises to the spindle midzone, and in telophase (the cell-dividing phase) it localises to the intercellular bridge. It is thought to be subsequently degraded. Mutations in CENPF lead to impaired cell division during early development. Mitosis has been found to take longer when the gene is mutated.

Microtubules are protein structures that are part of the cytoskeleton and are necessary for cells to have diverse, complex shapes and migratory ability. They are made by the centrosome, which contains a pair of cylindrical centrioles at right-angles to each other. Before division, CENPF localises at the end of one of the centrioles (the mother centriole) in order to orient microtubules correctly to form thin cellular projections called cilia. Most cilia are primary cilia, which are involved in cell signalling to trigger migration, division or differentiation. Mutations in CENPF disrupt this ability to form cilia; cilia have been found to be fewer in number and shorter when the gene is mutated.

CENPF is thought to form either a homodimer or heterodimer.

== Clinical significance ==
Mutations in both copies of CENPF cause Strømme syndrome, characterised by microcephaly, eye abnormalities and apple-peel jejunal atresia. Autoantibodies against CENPF have been found in patients with cancer or graft-versus-host disease.

== See also ==
- CENPE
- CENPJ
- CENPT
