= Henry Johnston Scott Matthew =

Scottish physician and toxicologist

Henry Matthew
- Born: 22 March 1914; Edinburgh
- Died: 7 April 1997 (aged 83)

Academic background
- Education: University of Edinburgh

Academic work
- Discipline: Toxicology
- Institutions: Edinburgh Royal Infirmary

Henry Johnston Scott Matthew FRCPE (22 March 1914 – 7 April 1997) was a Scottish physician and toxicologist in charge of the Regional Poisoning Treatment Centre from 1964 and Director of the Scottish Poisons Information Bureau from 1965. Matthew changed his career path, concentrating on Toxicology in 1957 and was known as the Father of Clinical Toxicology.

== Education and early career ==
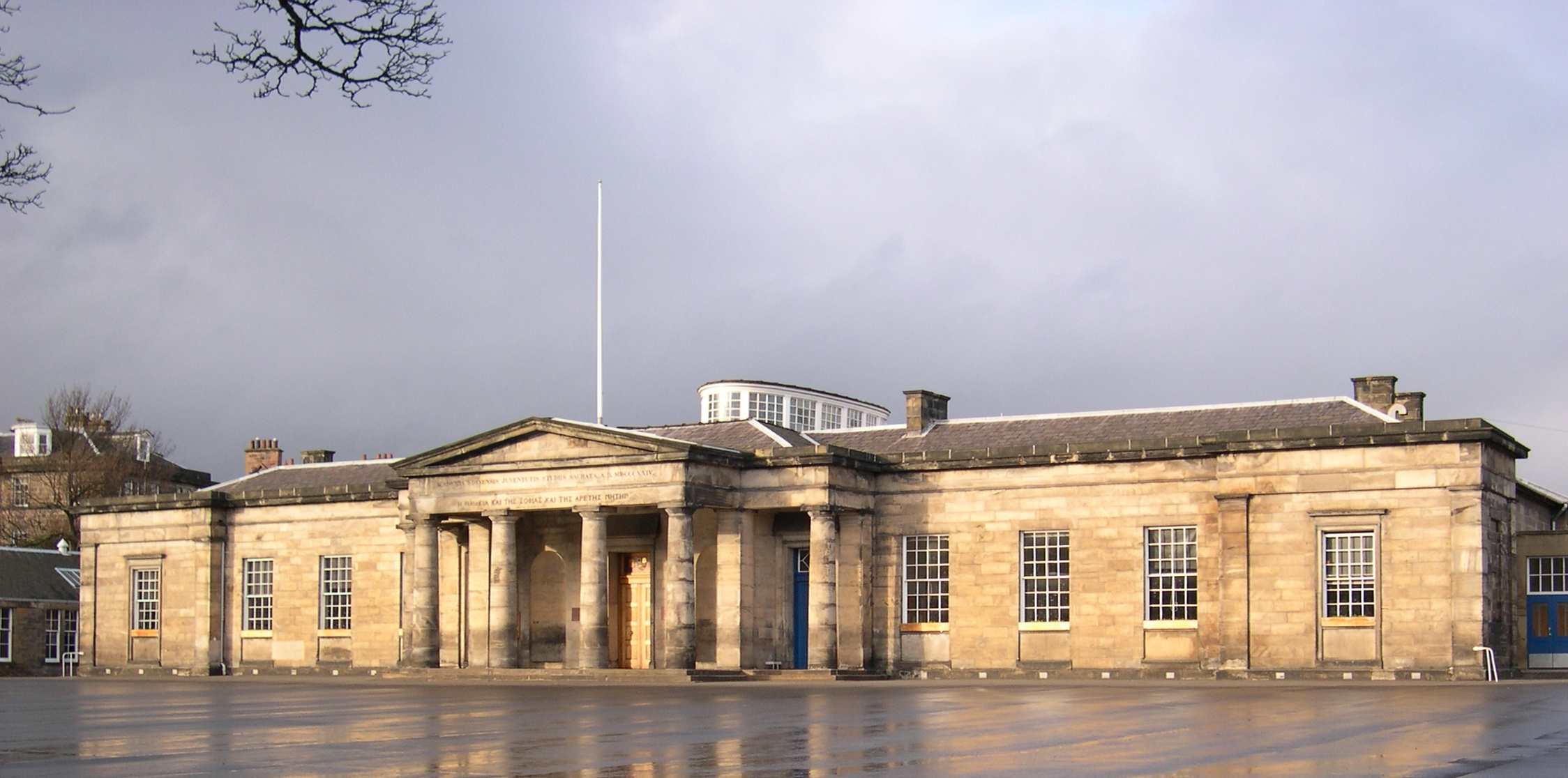
Edinburgh Academy

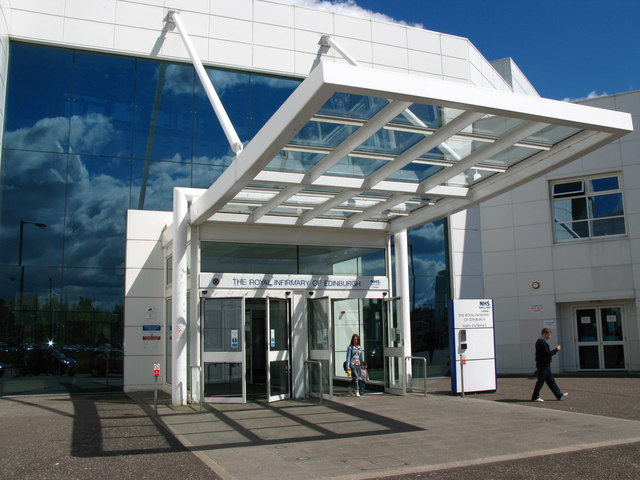
Royal Infirmary of Edinburgh

Matthew was born in Edinburgh in 1914. He went to the University of Edinburgh to study Medicine after schooling at Edinburgh Academy. Matthew graduated from the University of Edinburgh in the top five of the final examinations of 1937. His career in surgery began at the Royal Infirmary of Edinburgh and Great Ormond Street Hospital, London; however, this didn't last long because of the outbreak of World War II. During the war, he served with the Royal Army Medical Corps in the Middle East and Persia. Following the war, after a brief break, he returned to Scotland and went into general practice, joining the faculty of Medicine as a consultant physician specializing in Cardiology at Edinburgh Royal Infirmary in 1945. In 1951 he was elected a member of the Harveian Society of Edinburgh.

== Career change and research ==
Matthew had to convert his specialization because of the crucial decision made by the manager of the Royal Infirmary, designating the ward for incidental delirium (Ward 3) a Regional Poisoning Treatment Centre (RPTC) in response to a report issued by the Ministry of Health in England and the Scottish Home and Health Department. In 1964, He officially started his long-term research and clinical practice of Toxicology. Regarding the turning point of his motivation in concentrating on Toxicology, he noticed that patients were prescribed and overdosed on barbiturates as a remedy, with which he strongly disagreed. Matthew reassessed and improved the role of gastric lavage and aspiration in respect of barbiturates overdose, which was abandoned in Denmark in 1946; the research has become a recommended reference among the clinical staff widely.

== Later life ==
Matthew retired in 1975 and suffered from prostate cancer in his later life.

== Works ==
- Acute Barbiturate Poisoning, edited by Henry Matthew (Excerpta Medica, 1971)
- Treatment of common acute poisonings, edited by Henry Matthew and Alexander A. H. Lawson (Longman, 1975)
