= Familial multiple intestinal atresia =

- Other names: Familial intestinal polyatresia syndrome

Familial multiple intestinal atresia (FMIA) or familial intestinal polyatresia syndrome (FIPA) is an inherited disorder where atresia occurs at multiple locations throughout the small and large intestines. It presents at birth and the prognosis is very poor with almost all those diagnosed with this condition dying with one month. It may be associated with combined immunodeficiency.

== Presentation ==
In this disorder lesions can occur anywhere from the stomach to the anus. The clinical presentation depends on the location of the lesions(s).

== Genetics ==
The underlying lesion in this condition appears to be a mutation in the TTC7A gene. This gene is located on the short arm of chromosome 2 (2p16).

== History ==
This disorder was first described in 1971.
