= Norman–Roberts syndrome =

- Other names: Microlissencephaly type A, Lissencephaly 2
- This condition is inherited in an autosomal recessive manner.
- Specialty: Neurology

Norman–Roberts syndrome is a rare form of microlissencephaly caused by a mutation in the RELN gene. A small number of cases have been described. The syndrome was first reported by Margaret Grace Norman and M. Roberts et al. in 1976.

Lack of reelin prevents normal layering of the cerebral cortex and disrupts cognitive development. Patients have cerebellar hypoplasia, congenital lymphedema, and hypotonia. The disorder is also associated with myopia, nystagmus and generalized seizures.

Norman–Roberts syndrome is one of two known disorders caused by a disruption of the reelin-signaling pathway. The other is VLDLR-associated cerebellar hypoplasia, which is caused by a mutation in the gene coding for one of the reelin receptors, VLDLR.

Disruption of the RELN gene in human patients is analogous to the malfunctioning RELN gene in the reeler mouse.
