= Microlissencephaly =

Microcephaly combined with lissencephaly

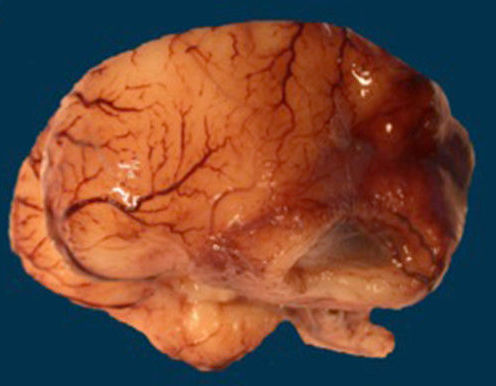
- Microlissencephaly in a 27 WG (week of gestation) foetus with TUBB2B mutation. Macroscopical view of the left hemisphere showing agyria, absent sylvian fissure and absent olfactory bulb.
- Specialty: Neurology
- Types: Norman-Roberts syndrome, Barth syndrome, MLIS3, MLIS4
- Causes: Genetic or viral

Microlissencephaly (MLIS) is a rare congenital brain disorder that combines severe microcephaly (small head) with lissencephaly (smooth brain surface due to absent sulci and gyri). Microlissencephaly is a heterogeneous disorder, i.e. it has many different causes and a variable clinical course. Microlissencephaly is a malformation of cortical development (MCD) that occurs due to failure of neuronal migration between the third and fifth month of gestation as well as stem cell population abnormalities. Numerous genes have been found to be associated with microlissencephaly, however, the pathophysiology is still not completely understood.

The combination of lissencephaly with severe congenital microcephaly is designated as microlissencephaly only when the cortex is abnormally thick. If such combination exists with a normal cortical thickness (2.5 to 3 mm), it is known as "microcephaly with simplified gyral pattern" (MSGP). Both MLIS and MSGP have a much more severe clinical course than microcephaly alone. They are inherited in autosomal recessive manner. Prior to 2000, the term "microlissencephaly" was used to designate both MLIS and MSGP.

== Types ==
Microlissencephaly is one of five subtypes of lissencephaly. Microlissencephaly, in turn, can be subclassified based on imaging and clinical picture into four types:

=== MLIS1 ===
Microlissencephaly Type A or Norman–Roberts syndrome (NRS): a microlissencephaly with thick cortex without infratentorial anomalies.

Other clinical features may include: a bitemporal narrowing, a broad nasal root. There is postnatal growth retardation, severe intellectual disability associated with pyramidal spasticity and epilepsy. This entity could be identical to "lissencephaly with cerebellar hypoplasia type B" (LCHb), and therefore linked to mutations in RELN gene.

=== MLIS2 ===
Microlissencephaly Type B or Barth microlissencephaly syndrome: is a microlissencephaly with thick cortex, severe cerebellar and brainstem hypoplasia. The Barth-type of MLIS is the most severe of all the known lissencephaly syndromes.

This phenotype consists of polyhydramnios (probably due to poor fetal swallowing), severe congenital microcephaly, weak respiratory effort, and survival for only a few hours or days. Barth described two siblings with this type as having a very low brainweight, wide ventricles, a very thin neopallium, absent corpus callosum and absent olfactory nerve.

=== MLIS3 ===
Microlissencephaly with intermediate cortex and abrupt anteroposterior gradient

=== MLIS4 ===
Microlissencephaly with mildly to moderately thick (6–8 mm) cortex, callosal agenesis

== Presentation ==
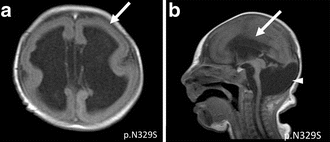
MRI of a patient with a TUBA1A mutation showing microlissencephaly with cerebellar hypoplasia. a. smooth brain surface (arrow) b. absent corpus callosum (arrow).

Microlissencephalic patients suffer from spasticity, seizures, severe developmental delay and intellectual disabilities with survival varying from days to years. Patients may also have dysmorphic craniofacial features, abnormal genitalia, and arthrogryposis.

Microlissencephaly may arise as a part of Baraitser-Winter syndrome which comprises also ptosis, coloboma, hearing loss and learning disability. Moreover, it is the distinct developmental brain abnormality in "microcephalic osteodysplastic primordial dwarfism" (MOPD1). Microlissencephaly may be accompanied by micromelia as in Basel-Vanagaite-Sirota syndrome (a.k.a. Microlissencephaly-Micromelia syndrome).

== Pathophysiology ==
Genes associated with MLIS
Gene	Location	OMIM number
RELN	7q22.1	600514
CIT	12q24.23	605629
NDE1	16p13.11	609449
KATNB1	16q21	602703
WDR62	19q13.12	613583
ACTG1	17q25.3	102560
TUBA1A	12q13.12	602529
TUBB2B	6p25.2	612850
TUBB3	16q24.3	602661
TUBA3E	2q21.1	619918
TUBG1	17q21.2	191135
DMRTA2	1p32.3	614804

The genetic basis and pathophysiology of microlissencephaly are still not completely understood. Most cases of microlissencephaly are described in consanguineous families suggesting an autosomal recessive inheritance. Mutation of RELN gene or CIT could cause MLIS. Human NDE1 mutations and mouse Nde1 loss lead to cortical lamination deficits, which, together with reduced neuronal production cause microlissencephaly. Homozygous frameshift mutations in NDE1 gene was found to cause microlissencephaly with up to 90% reduction in brain mass and seizures starting early in life. Some other disease-causing genes include: KATNB1 and WDR62. It is hypothesized that the KATNB1-associated microlissencephaly is the result of a combined effect of reduced neural progenitor populations and impaired interaction between the Katanin P80 subunit (encoded by KATNB1) and LIS1 (a.k.a. PAFAH1B1), a protein mutated in type 1 lissencephaly. Missense mutation in ACTG1 gene was identified in three cases of microlissencephaly. ACTG1 is the same gene that, when mutated, causes Baraitser-Winter syndrome. A loss-of-function mutation in the Doublesex- and Mab-3–Related Transcription factor A2 (DMRTA2, also known as DMRT5) gene has been reported in a case of microlissencephaly, implicating DMRTA2 as a critical regulator of cortical neural progenitor cell dynamics.

Microlissencepahly is considered a tubulinopathy (tubulin gene defect) i.e. is caused by mutation in tubulin genes, mainly TUBA1A and less commonly TUBB2B, TUBB3, TUBA3E and TUBG1. Central pachygyria, polymicrogyria are more commonly seen in patients with defects in TUBB2B, TUBB3, and TUBB5. This implys the critical role of microtubule cytoskeleton in the pathophysiology of microlissencephaly as well as other neuronal migration disorders.

Congenital infections like cytomegalovirus are also known to cause microlissencephaly.

Both microlissencephaly and microcephaly with simplified gyral pattern result from either decreased stem cell proliferation or increased apoptosis in the germinal zone of the cerebral cortex.

== Diagnosis ==
Microlissencephaly can be diagnosed by prenatal MRI. MRI is better than ultrasound when it comes to detecting microlissencephaly or MSGP prenatally. The ideal time for proper prenatal diagnosis is between the 34th and 35th gestational week which is the time when the secondary gyration normally terminates. In microlissencephaly cases, the primary sulci would be unusually wide and flat while secondary sulci would be missing.

At birth, lissencephaly with a head circumference of less than minus three standard deviations (< –3 SD) is considered microlissencephaly.

Although genetic diagnosis in patients with MLIS is challenging, exome sequencing has been suggested to be a powerful diagnostic tool.

=== Dobyns-Barkovich classification ===
In 1999, Dobyns and Barkovich suggested a classification of patients with severe microcephaly combined with gyral abnormalities including: microcephaly with simplified gyral pattern (MSGP), microlissencephaly and polymicrogyria. The classification divided those patients into ten groups in which MSGP represented the first four groups, microlissencephaly referred to the groups from 5-8 and polymicrogyria in the last two groups.

In Dobyns-Barkovich classification, Dobyns-Barkovich type 6 is equivalent to Norman-Roberts syndrome (MLIS1) while Dobyns-Barkovich type 8 corresponds to Barth microlissencephaly syndrome (MLIS2).

=== Differential diagnosis ===
Microlissencephaly is considered a more severe form than microcephaly with simplified gyral pattern. Microlissencephaly is characterized by a smooth cortical surface (absent sulci and gyri) with a thickened cortex (> 3 mm) and is usually associated with other congenital anomalies. Microcephaly with a simplified gyral pattern has too few sulci and normal cortical thickness (3 mm) and is usually an isolated anomaly.

Microlissencephaly and microcephaly with simplified gyral pattern
	Microlissencephaly	MSGP
Mode of inheritance (if genetic)	Autosomal recessive	
Cortical thickness	thickened (>3 mm)	normal (3 mm)
Cortical surface	smooth	too few sulci
Severity	Severe form	Mild form
Associated anomalies?	usually present	not present (MSGP is usually isolated)

== Prognosis ==
Many patients will die within the first 10 years of life.

== Epidemiology ==
Microlissencephaly is listed in Orphanet database as a rare disease. There is not much information available about the epidemiology of microlissencepahly in literature. A PhD thesis has estimated the prevalence of microlissencepahly in southeastern Hungary between July 1992 and June 2006 to be a case every 91,000 live births (0.11:10,000).

== History ==
In 1976, the first syndrome with MLIS was reported, now known as Norman–Roberts syndrome (MLIS type A). The Barth type (MLIS type B) was for the first time described in 1982 in two siblings who died soon after birth.
