= Meconium peritonitis =

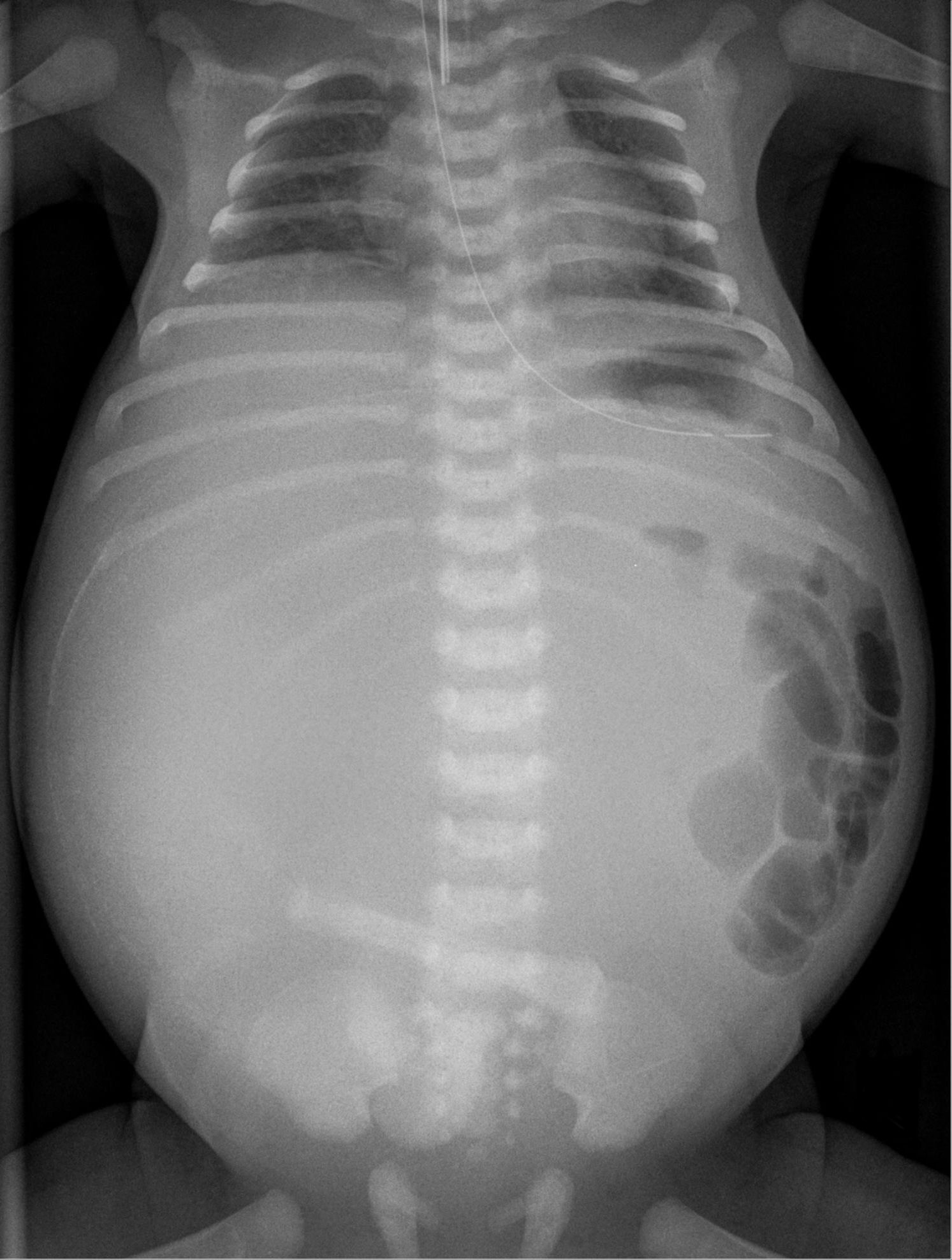
- X-ray of a newborn with meconium pseudocyst resulting from bowel perforation. In this case the cause was atresia of the terminal ileum. There is a fine rim of calcification surrounding the big pseudocyst which shifts the other intestinal structures outwards.
- Specialty: Pediatrics

Meconium peritonitis refers to rupture of the bowel prior to birth, resulting in fetal stool (meconium) escaping into the surrounding space (peritoneum) leading to inflammation (peritonitis). Despite the bowel rupture, many infants born after meconium peritonitis in utero have normal bowels and have no further issues.

Infants with cystic fibrosis are at increased risk for meconium peritonitis.

== Diagnosis ==
Twenty percent of infants born with meconium peritonitis will have vomiting and dilated bowels on x-rays which necessitates surgery.

Meconium peritonitis is sometimes diagnosed on prenatal ultrasound where it appears as calcifications within the peritoneum.

== Treatment ==
Adhesiolysis partial resection of pseudocyst covering enterostomy.

== History ==
Meconium peritonitis was first described in 1838 by Carl von Rokitansky.
