= Centromere protein E =

Centromere- and microtubule-associated protein

CENPE
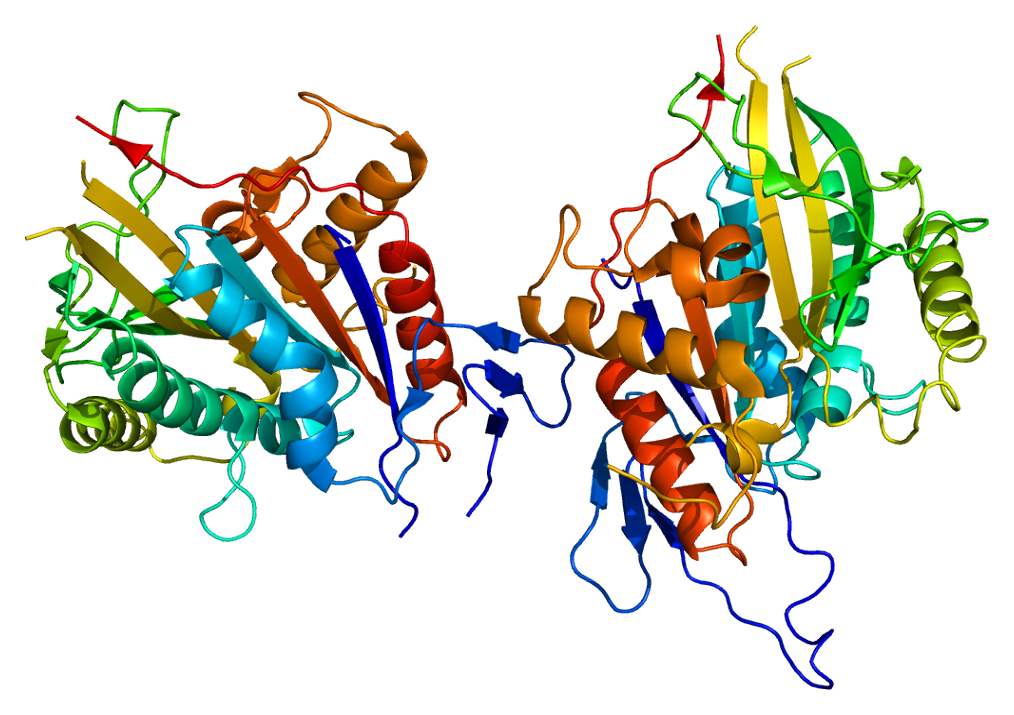

Identifiers
- Aliases: CENPE, CENP-E, KIF10, PPP1R61, MCPH13, Centromere protein E
- External IDs: OMIM: 117143; MGI: 1098230; GeneCards: CENPE
Available structures
| PDB | Ortholog search: PDBe RCSB |
| PDB | List of PDB id codes 1T5C |

Gene location (Human)
| Chr. | Chromosome 4 (human) |
| Band | 4q24 | Start | 103,105,349 bp |
| Band | 4q24 | End | 103,198,445 bp |

Gene location (Mouse)
| Chr. | Chromosome 3 (mouse) |
| Band | 3 G3|3 62.55 cM | Start | 134,918,298 bp |
| Band | 3 G3|3 62.55 cM | End | 134,979,372 bp |
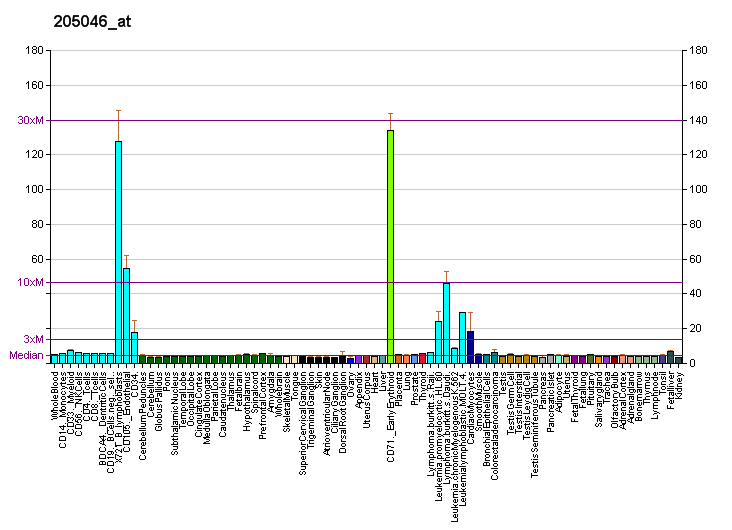
RNA expression pattern
| Bgee | Human / Mouse (ortholog); Top expressed in: oocyte; ventricular zone; testicle; secondary oocyte; ganglionic eminence; gonad; trabecular bone; bone marrow; stromal cell of endometrium; bone marrow cell / Top expressed in: zygote; secondary oocyte; genital tubercle; tail of embryo; maxillary prominence; ventricular zone; primary oocyte; mandibular prominence; abdominal wall; vas deferens; More reference expression data |
| BioGPS | More reference expression data |
Gene ontology
| Molecular function | nucleotide binding; ATPase activity; ATP binding; protein binding; microtubule motor activity; microtubule binding; kinetochore binding |
| Cellular component | spindle; kinesin complex; chromosome; nucleus; outer kinetochore; chromosome, centromeric region; membrane; midbody; microtubule; kinetochore; condensed chromosome, centromeric region; microtubule cytoskeleton; mitotic spindle midzone; cytoskeleton; cytoplasm; cytosol; kinetochore microtubule; nucleoplasm; spindle midzone |
| Biological process | regulation of mitotic metaphase/anaphase transition; cell cycle; positive regulation of protein kinase activity; multicellular organism development; cell division; antigen processing and presentation of exogenous peptide antigen via MHC class II; kinetochore assembly; microtubule-based movement; sister chromatid cohesion; retrograde vesicle-mediated transport, Golgi to endoplasmic reticulum; metaphase plate congression; lateral attachment of mitotic spindle microtubules to kinetochore; mitotic cell cycle; mitotic spindle organization; mitotic chromosome movement towards spindle pole; microtubule plus-end directed mitotic chromosome migration; chromosome segregation; mitotic metaphase plate congression; attachment of mitotic spindle microtubules to kinetochore |
Sources:Amigo / QuickGO
Orthologs
| Databases | NCBI: entry; OMA: entry |
| Species | Human | Mouse |
| Entrez | 1062 | 229841 |
| Ensembl | ENSG00000138778 | ENSMUSG00000045328 |
| UniProt | Q02224 | Q6RT24 |
| RefSeq (mRNA) | NM_001286734; NM_001813 | NM_173762 |
| RefSeq (protein) | NP_001273663; NP_001804 | NP_776123 |
| Location (UCSC) | Chr 4: 103.11 – 103.2 Mb | Chr 3: 134.92 – 134.98 Mb |
| PubMed search |
- Wikidata
| View/Edit Human | View/Edit Mouse |

Centromere-associated protein E is a protein that in humans is encoded by the CENPE gene.

Centromere-associated protein E is a kinesin-like motor protein that accumulates in the G2 phase of the cell cycle. Unlike other centromere-associated proteins, it is not present during interphase and first appears at the centromere region of chromosomes during prometaphase. CENPE is proposed to be one of the motors responsible for mammalian chromosome movement and/or spindle elongation.

CENPE is also called Kinesin-7.

== Clinical significance ==
Mutations in CENPE result in autosomal recessive primary microcephaly type 13, which includes skeletal abnormalities and immunodeficiency.

== See also ==
- CENPF
- CENPJ
- CENPT
