= KATNB1 =

Protein-coding gene in the species Homo sapiens

Identifiers
- Aliases: KATNB1, KAT, LIS6, katanin regulatory subunit B1
- External IDs: OMIM: 602703; MGI: 1921437; GeneCards: KATNB1

Gene location (Human)
| Chr. | Chromosome 16 (human) |
| Band | 16q21 | Start | 57,735,739 bp |
| Band | 16q21 | End | 57,757,244 bp |

Gene location (Mouse)
| Chr. | Chromosome 8 (mouse) |
| Band | 8|8 C5 | Start | 95,807,814 bp |
| Band | 8|8 C5 | End | 95,829,777 bp |
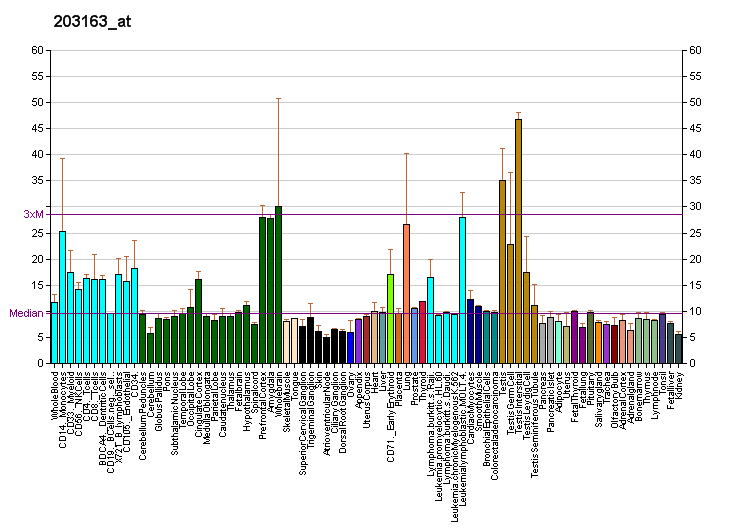

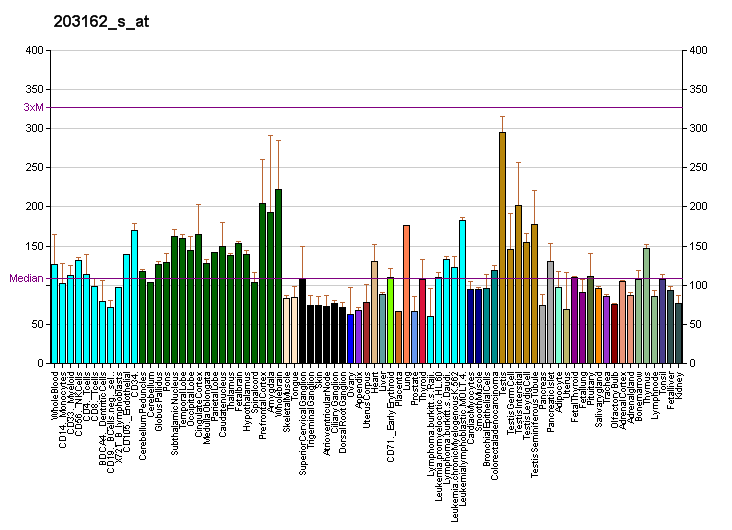
RNA expression pattern
| Bgee | Human / Mouse (ortholog); Top expressed in: middle temporal gyrus; right frontal lobe; right uterine tube; Brodmann area 23; oocyte; prefrontal cortex; primary visual cortex; Brodmann area 9; endothelial cell; Brodmann area 10 / Top expressed in: seminiferous tubule; spermatid; spermatocyte; yolk sac; visual cortex; primary visual cortex; superior frontal gyrus; dentate gyrus of hippocampal formation granule cell; granulocyte; internal carotid artery; More reference expression data |
| BioGPS | More reference expression data |
Gene ontology
| Molecular function | protein heterodimerization activity; microtubule-severing ATPase activity; microtubule binding; dynein complex binding; protein binding |
| Cellular component | cytoplasm; microtubule organizing center; growth cone; nucleus; axon; spindle pole; membrane; centrosome; midbody; microtubule; soma; microtubule cytoskeleton; plasma membrane; cytoskeleton; katanin complex; cytosol; spindle |
| Biological process | positive regulation of neuron projection development; cell cycle; negative regulation of microtubule depolymerization; cell division; protein targeting; microtubule severing; positive regulation of cell death; positive regulation of microtubule depolymerization; microtubule depolymerization; mitotic chromosome movement towards spindle pole |
Sources:Amigo / QuickGO
Orthologs
| Databases | NCBI: entry; OMA: entry |
| Species | Human | Mouse |
| Entrez | 10300 | 74187 |
| Ensembl | ENSG00000140854 | ENSMUSG00000031787 |
| UniProt | Q9BVA0 | Q8BG40 |
| RefSeq (mRNA) | NM_005886 | NM_028805 |
| RefSeq (protein) | NP_005877 | NP_083081 |
| Location (UCSC) | Chr 16: 57.74 – 57.76 Mb | Chr 8: 95.81 – 95.83 Mb |
| PubMed search |
- Wikidata
| View/Edit Human | View/Edit Mouse |

Katanin p80 WD40-containing subunit B1 is a protein that in humans is encoded by the KATNB1 gene.

Microtubules, polymers of alpha and beta tubulin subunits, form the mitotic spindle of a dividing cell and help to organize membranous organelles during interphase. Katanin is a heterodimer that consists of a 60 kDa ATPase (p60 subunit A 1) and an 80 kDa accessory protein (p80 subunit B 1). The p60 subunit acts to sever and disassemble microtubules, while the p80 subunit targets the enzyme to the centrosome. Katanin is a member of the AAA family of ATPases. KATNB1 is associated with microlissencephaly.
