= Tubulin alpha-1A chain =

Protein-coding gene in the species Homo sapiens

TUBA1A
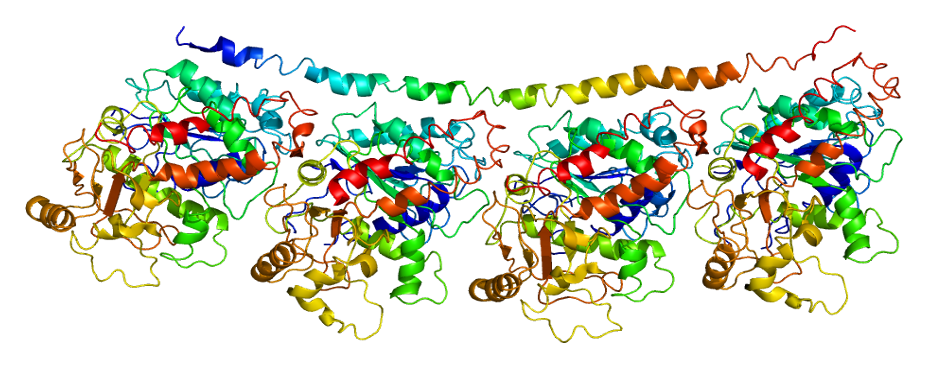

Identifiers
- Aliases: TUBA1A, B-ALPHA-1, LIS3, TUBA3, tubulin alpha 1a
- External IDs: OMIM: 602529; MGI: 98869; GeneCards: TUBA1A
Available structures
PDB	Ortholog search: PDBe RCSB
PDB	List of PDB id codes 3HKC, 4X20, 3HKE, 3N2G, 4X1Y, 3N2K, 4X1I, 4X1K, 3HKB, 3HKD, 5JCO

Gene location (Human)
Chr.	Chromosome 12 (human)
Band	12q13.12	Start	49,184,686 bp
Band	12q13.12	End	49,189,080 bp

Gene location (Mouse)
Chr.	Chromosome 15 (mouse)
Band	15 F1|15 55.29 cM	Start	98,847,718 bp
Band	15 F1|15 55.29 cM	End	98,851,584 bp
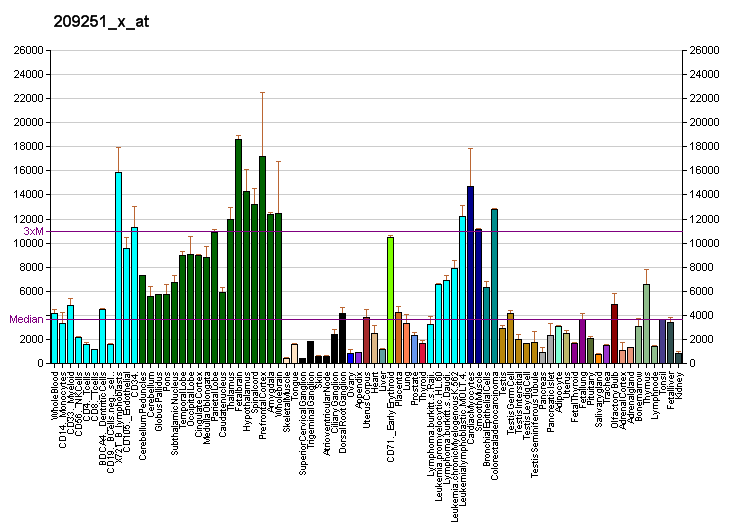

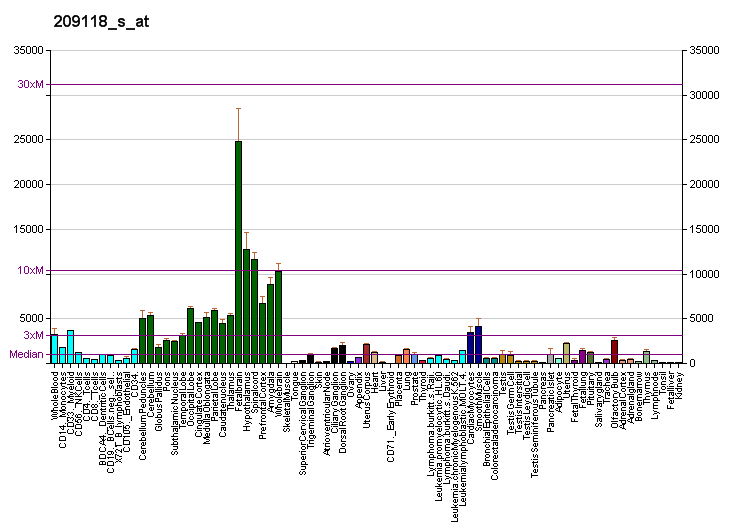

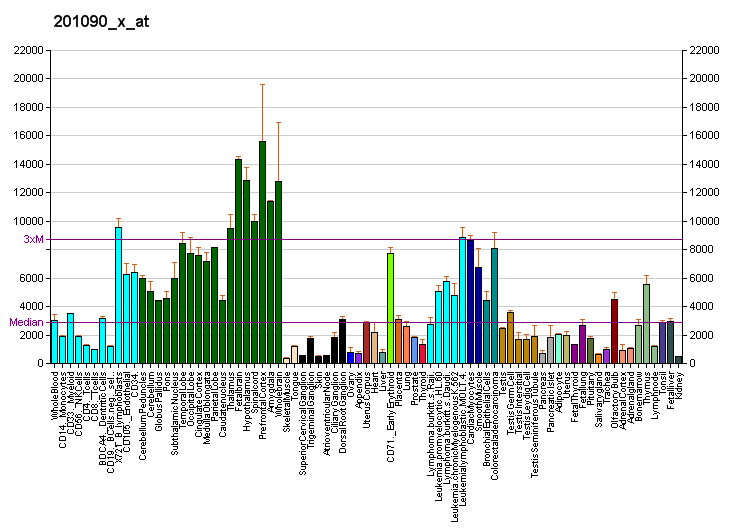
RNA expression pattern
Bgee	Human / Mouse (ortholog); Top expressed in: endothelial cell; ganglionic eminence; inferior ganglion of vagus nerve; superior vestibular nucleus; spinal ganglia; inferior olivary nucleus; ventricular zone; bronchial epithelial cell; optic nerve; subthalamic nucleus / Top expressed in: trigeminal ganglion; mammillary body; medial dorsal nucleus; fossa; condyle; medial vestibular nucleus; median eminence; superior cervical ganglion; medial geniculate nucleus; paraventricular nucleus of hypothalamus; More reference expression data
BioGPS	More reference expression data
Gene ontology
Molecular function	nucleotide binding; protein domain specific binding; GTP binding; structural molecule activity; structural constituent of cytoskeleton; protein binding; GTPase activity
Cellular component	cytoplasm; recycling endosome; cytosol; myelin sheath; cytoplasmic microtubule; cytoplasmic ribonucleoprotein granule; microtubule; extracellular exosome; cytoskeleton; nucleus; microtubule cytoskeleton; membrane raft; neuromuscular junction
Biological process	cytoskeleton-dependent intracellular transport; cell division; G2/M transition of mitotic cell cycle; microtubule-based process; cytoskeleton organization; ciliary basal body-plasma membrane docking; regulation of G2/M transition of mitotic cell cycle; microtubule cytoskeleton organization; mitotic cell cycle; regulation of synapse organization
Sources:Amigo / QuickGO
Orthologs
Databases	NCBI: entry; OMA: entry
Species	Human	Mouse
Entrez	7846	22142
Ensembl	ENSG00000167552	ENSMUSG00000072235
UniProt	Q71U36	P68369
RefSeq (mRNA)	NM_006009; NM_001270399; NM_001270400	NM_011653
RefSeq (protein)	NP_001257328; NP_001257329; NP_006000	NP_035783
Location (UCSC)	Chr 12: 49.18 – 49.19 Mb	Chr 15: 98.85 – 98.85 Mb
PubMed search
- Wikidata
View/Edit Human	View/Edit Mouse

Tubulin alpha-1A chain is a protein that in humans is encoded by the TUBA1A gene.

Tubulin alpha-1A chain is a type of alpha-tubulin involved in the formation of microtubules, which are structural proteins that play a role in the cytoskeletal structure. Microtubules are composed of heterodimers of alpha- and beta-tubulin molecules. Tubulin alpha-1A (TUBA1A) is a primary alpha-tubulin expressed in the human fetal brain, specifically found in that structure.

== Function ==
Microtubules of the eukaryotic cytoskeleton perform essential and diverse functions and are composed of a heterodimer of alpha and beta tubulins. The genes encoding these microtubule constituents belong to the tubulin superfamily, which is composed of six distinct families. Genes from the alpha, beta and gamma tubulin families are found in all eukaryotes. The alpha and beta tubulins represent the major components of microtubules, while gamma tubulin plays a critical role in the nucleation of microtubule assembly. There are multiple alpha and beta tubulin genes, which are highly conserved among species. This gene encodes alpha tubulin and is highly similar to mouse and rat Tuba1 gene. Northern blotting studies have shown that the gene expression is predominantly found in morphologically differentiated neurologic cells. This gene is one of three alpha-tubulin genes in a cluster on chromosome 12q.

Alpha-tubulins, including TUBA1A, are involved in neuronal development and maturation. Studies have shown that the rat homologs of human TUBA1A, such as Tα1, exhibit elevated expression during the extension of neuronal processes. In experiments where pheochromocytoma cells were cultured with Nerve Growth Factor (NGF), differentiation and the development of neuronal processes were observed, accompanied by a significant increase in Tα1 mRNA expression, while T26 mRNA expression showed minimal change.

TUBA1A is believed to play a role in neuronal migration by regulating microtubule dynamics, enabling the rapid formation and disassembly of polymers, which allows for the extension and retraction of processes necessary for nucleokinesis.

RNA in situ hybridization studies demonstrated the expression of TUBA1A in mouse embryos. Embryonic day 16.5 sections showed strong labeling in the telencephalon, diencephalon, mesencephalon, developing cerebellum, brainstem, spinal cord, and dorsal root ganglia.

== Interactions ==
TUBA1A has been shown to interact with PAFAH1B1.

== Animal models ==
Keays et al. describe a mouse with a mutation of the TUBA1A gene induced by N-ethyl-N-nitrosourea. The relevant point mutation resulted in S140G; the site of the mutation participates in the N-site of the formed α-tubulin, and participates in stabilizing the α-β tubulin polymer by binding GTP at this site. The S140G mutation resulted in the formation of a "compromised GTP binding pocket". Authors note defects associated with cortical layers II/III and IV, especially in cortical neuronal migration (with respect to wild-type counterparts), showing that the S140G mutation has value as a model for detailing disease associated with the Human TUBA homolog.

== Clinical significance ==
Mutations to the TUBA1A gene manifest clinically as Type 3 Lissencephaly. In general, lissencephaly is characterized by agyria (lacking of gyri and sulci to the brain – a smooth brain), seizure activity, failure to thrive, as well as intellectual disability and psychomotor retardation, often to a profound degree. The symptoms of Lis3 Lissencephaly are not especially different from generalized lissencephaly (Lis1, related to PAFAH1B1). Diagnosis of lissencephaly generally is made from the symptom profile, while attribution to a specific type is obtained by microarray. Treatment is symptomatic; anti-convulsive drugs for seizure activity, g-button gastrostomy to feed the child, physical therapy for muscle disorders. TUBA1A mutation is common in microlissencephaly
