= CPAP (gene) =

Centromere- and microtubule-associated protein

Identifiers
- Aliases: CPAP, BM032, CENP-J, LAP, LIP1, MCPH6, SASS4, SCKL4, Sas-4, centromere protein J, CENPJ
- External IDs: OMIM: 609279; MGI: 2684927; GeneCards: CPAP
Available structures
PDB	Ortholog search: PDBe RCSB
PDB	List of PDB id codes 5ITZ

Gene location (Human)
Chr.	Chromosome 13 (human)
Band	13q12.12-q12.13	Start	24,882,279 bp
Band	13q12.12-q12.13	End	24,922,889 bp

Gene location (Mouse)
Chr.	Chromosome 14 (mouse)
Band	14|14 C3	Start	56,764,218 bp
Band	14|14 C3	End	56,812,882 bp
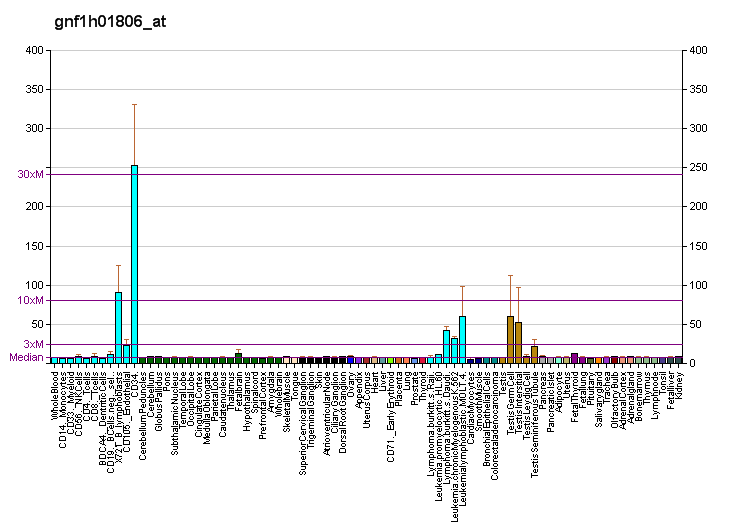

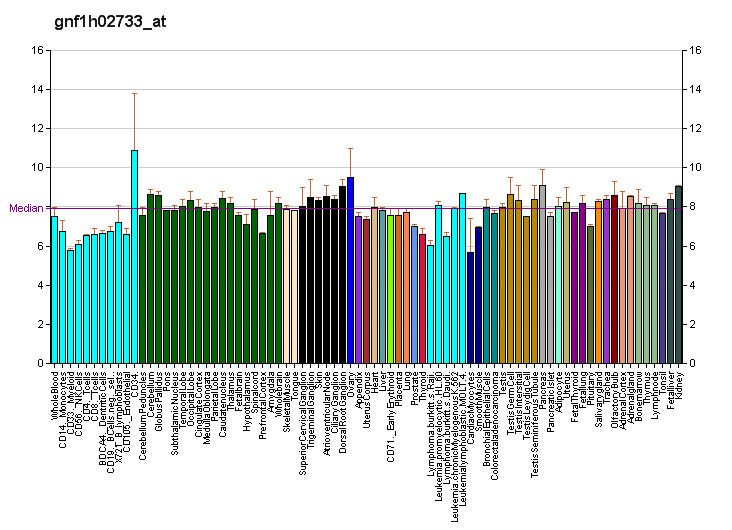

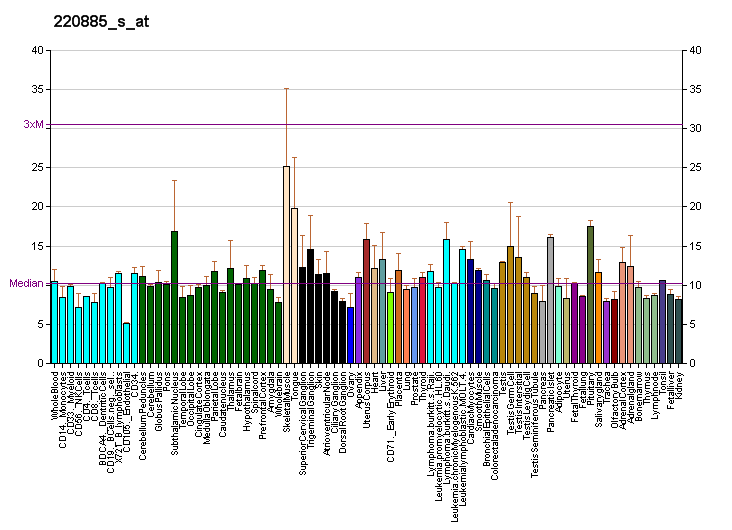
RNA expression pattern
Bgee	Human / Mouse (ortholog); Top expressed in: sperm; left lobe of thyroid gland; right lobe of thyroid gland; right hemisphere of cerebellum; right testis; left testis; gonad; testicle; ventricular zone; ganglionic eminence / Top expressed in: secondary oocyte; zygote; primary oocyte; genital tubercle; tail of embryo; hand; granulocyte; ventricular zone; ganglionic eminence; epiblast; More reference expression data
BioGPS	More reference expression data
Gene ontology
Molecular function	protein binding; protein kinase binding; protein domain specific binding; tubulin binding; identical protein binding; transcription corepressor activity
Cellular component	cytoplasm; microtubule organizing center; gamma-tubulin small complex; cytosol; centrosome; microtubule; cytoskeleton; centriole; nucleoplasm; plasma membrane; ciliary basal body; nucleus
Biological process	regulation of centriole replication; centriole replication; microtubule polymerization; G2/M transition of mitotic cell cycle; microtubule nucleation; centriole elongation; cell division; ciliary basal body-plasma membrane docking; regulation of G2/M transition of mitotic cell cycle; smoothened signaling pathway; motile cilium assembly; centrosome duplication; centriole assembly; positive regulation of non-motile cilium assembly; non-motile cilium assembly; positive regulation of centriole elongation; positive regulation of establishment of protein localization; negative regulation of nucleic acid-templated transcription
Sources:Amigo / QuickGO
Orthologs
Databases	NCBI: entry; OMA: entry
Species	Human	Mouse
Entrez	55835	219103
Ensembl	ENSG00000151849	ENSMUSG00000064128
UniProt	Q9HC77	Q569L8
RefSeq (mRNA)	NM_018451	NM_001014996
RefSeq (protein)	NP_060921	NP_001014996; NP_001390462; NP_001390463
Location (UCSC)	Chr 13: 24.88 – 24.92 Mb	Chr 14: 56.76 – 56.81 Mb
PubMed search
- Wikidata
View/Edit Human	View/Edit Mouse

Centrosomal P4.1-associated protein is a protein that in humans is encoded by the CPAP gene (previously CENPJ). It has also been known as Centromere protein J (CENP-J). During cell division, this protein plays a structural role in the maintenance of centrosome integrity and normal spindle morphology, and it is involved in microtubule disassembly at the centrosome. This protein can function as a transcriptional coactivator in the Stat5 signaling pathway and also as a coactivator of NF-kappaB-mediated transcription, likely via its interaction with the coactivator p300/CREB-binding protein.

The Drosophila ortholog, sas-4, has been shown to be a scaffold for a cytoplasmic complex of Cnn, Asl, CP-190, tubulin and D-PLP (similar to the human proteins PCNT and AKAP9). These complexes are then anchored at the centriole to begin formation of the centrosome.

== Clinical significance ==
Mutations in CENPJ are associated with Seckel syndrome type 4 and primary autosomal recessive microcephaly, a disorder characterized by severely reduced brain size and intellectual disability. Interestingly, CENPJ interacts with other microcephaly aossciated proteins such as WDR62 and both coordinate a regulatory function neocortical development and brain growth.

== Interactions ==
CENPJ has been shown to interact with EPB41.

== See also ==
- CENPE
- CENPF
- CENPT
