= WDR62 =

Protein-coding gene in the species Homo sapiens

Identifiers
- Aliases: WDR62, C19orf14, MCPH2, WD repeat domain 62
- External IDs: OMIM: 613583; MGI: 1923696; GeneCards: WDR62

Gene location (Human)
Chr.	Chromosome 19 (human)
Band	19q13.12	Start	36,054,649 bp
Band	19q13.12	End	36,105,108 bp

Gene location (Mouse)
Chr.	Chromosome 7 (mouse)
Band	7|7 B1	Start	29,939,563 bp
Band	7|7 B1	End	29,979,844 bp
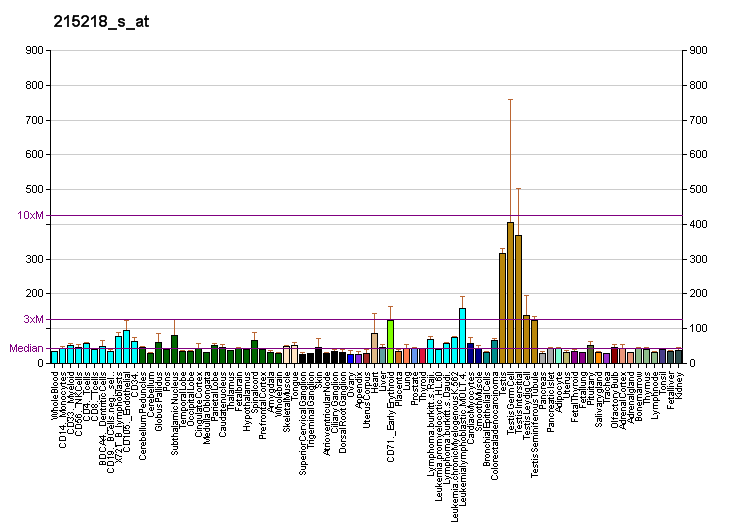
RNA expression pattern
Bgee	Human / Mouse (ortholog); Top expressed in: left testis; right testis; apex of heart; thoracic diaphragm; triceps brachii muscle; vastus lateralis muscle; muscle of thigh; Skeletal muscle tissue of rectus abdominis; biceps brachii; glutes / Top expressed in: seminiferous tubule; spermatocyte; spermatid; secondary oocyte; esophagus; genital tubercle; muscle of thigh; tail of embryo; zygote; morula; More reference expression data
BioGPS	More reference expression data
Gene ontology
Molecular function	protein binding; RNA binding
Cellular component	nucleus; centriole; cytoplasm; centrosome; spindle pole; cytoskeleton; U5 snRNP; precatalytic spliceosome; catalytic step 2 spliceosome; microtubule organizing center; cytosol
Biological process	mitotic spindle organization; nervous system development; centriole replication; cerebral cortex development; neurogenesis; RNA splicing
Sources:Amigo / QuickGO
Orthologs
Databases	NCBI: entry; OMA: entry
Species	Human	Mouse
Entrez	284403	233064
Ensembl	ENSG00000075702	ENSMUSG00000037020
UniProt	O43379	Q3U3T8
RefSeq (mRNA)	NM_001083961; NM_173636	NM_146186
RefSeq (protein)	NP_001077430; NP_775907	n/a
Location (UCSC)	Chr 19: 36.05 – 36.11 Mb	Chr 7: 29.94 – 29.98 Mb
PubMed search
- Wikidata
View/Edit Human	View/Edit Mouse

WD repeat-containing protein 62 is a protein that in humans is encoded by the WDR62 gene.

== Function ==
WDR62 is a scaffold protein and interacts with different kinases. WDR62 plays a role in mediating activation of the JNK pathway in response to TNFα. This finding might have implications in the research of TNFα related diseases such as autoimmune diseases and cancer. It has been also shown that WDR62 upregulation can lead to overproliferation of glia cells and potentially glioma and this is coupled with an upregulation in AURKA, AKT, MYC and PI3K signalling.

WDR62 effect on neurogenesis is regulated by MEKK3 in coordination with FBW7 (F-box and WD repeat domain-containing protein 7).

WDR62 has been shown to have a regulatory role on hippocampus development and neurogenesis.

WDR62 is also involved in male spermatogenesis with an essential role in centriole duplication and manchette removal during the spermatogenesis process. The deficiency of WDR62 results in low sperm counts with defected motility, and abnormal morphology.

== Clinical significance ==
Mutations in the WDR62 gene cause of a wide spectrum of severe cerebral cortical malformations including microcephaly, pachygyria with cortical thickening, hypoplasia of the corpus callosum, polymicrogyria as well as microlissencephaly.

Cortical malformation, associated with WDR62 point mutations occurring in humans (V65M and R438H) has been linked to ciliopathies. These WDR62 point mutations drive ciliary disruption in Radial glial cell via disrupting the cilia and centrosome localization of CENPJ and the Intraflagellar transport protein 88 (IFT88), which are required for tubulin requitment to centrosome and transport of tubulin to the cilia tip, respectively.
