= Tubulin beta-3 chain =

Microtubule element of the tubulin family

TUBB3
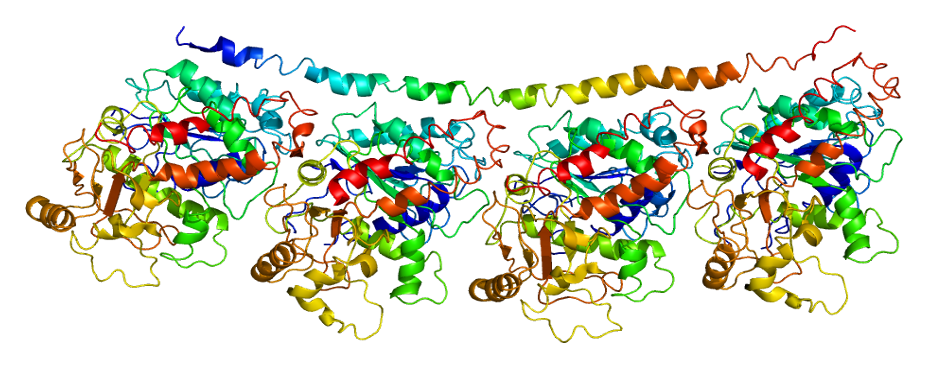

Identifiers
- Aliases: TUBB3, CDCBM, CDCBM1, CFEOM3, CFEOM3A, FEOM3, TUBB4, beta-4, tubulin beta 3 class III
- External IDs: OMIM: 602661; MGI: 107813; GeneCards: TUBB3
Available structures
PDB	Ortholog search: PDBe RCSB
PDB	List of PDB id codes 5IJ0, 5JCO, 5IJ9

Gene location (Human)
Chr.	Chromosome 16 (human)
Band	16q24.3	Start	89,921,392 bp
Band	16q24.3	End	89,938,761 bp

Gene location (Mouse)
Chr.	Chromosome 8 (mouse)
Band	8|8 E1	Start	124,138,163 bp
Band	8|8 E1	End	124,148,754 bp
RNA expression pattern
Bgee	Human / Mouse (ortholog); Top expressed in: ganglionic eminence; superior frontal gyrus; hypothalamus; ventricular zone; primary visual cortex; prefrontal cortex; right frontal lobe; dorsolateral prefrontal cortex; Brodmann area 9; anterior cingulate cortex / Top expressed in: ganglionic eminence; superior cervical ganglion; perirhinal cortex; medial ganglionic eminence; entorhinal cortex; facial motor nucleus; CA3 field; primary visual cortex; superior frontal gyrus; dentate gyrus of hippocampal formation granule cell; More reference expression data
BioGPS	n/a
Gene ontology
Molecular function	nucleotide binding; GTP binding; structural constituent of cytoskeleton; protein binding; GTPase activity; netrin receptor binding
Cellular component	cytoplasm; microtubule; extracellular exosome; cytoskeleton; nucleus; microtubule cytoskeleton; dendrite; axon; lamellipodium; filopodium; growth cone; cell projection
Biological process	microtubule-based process; cytoskeleton organization; axon guidance; microtubule cytoskeleton organization; mitotic cell cycle; neuron differentiation; netrin-activated signaling pathway; dorsal root ganglion development
Sources:Amigo / QuickGO
Orthologs
Databases	NCBI: entry; OMA: entry
Species	Human	Mouse
Entrez	10381	22152
Ensembl	ENSG00000258947	ENSMUSG00000062380
UniProt	Q13509	Q9ERD7
RefSeq (mRNA)	NM_006086; NM_001197181	NM_023279
RefSeq (protein)	NP_001184110; NP_006077	NP_075768
Location (UCSC)	Chr 16: 89.92 – 89.94 Mb	Chr 8: 124.14 – 124.15 Mb
PubMed search
- Wikidata
View/Edit Human	View/Edit Mouse

Tubulin beta-3 chain, Class III β-tubulin, βIII-tubulin (β3-tubulin) or β-tubulin III, is a microtubule element of the tubulin family found almost exclusively in neurons, and in testis cells. In humans, it is encoded by the TUBB3 gene.

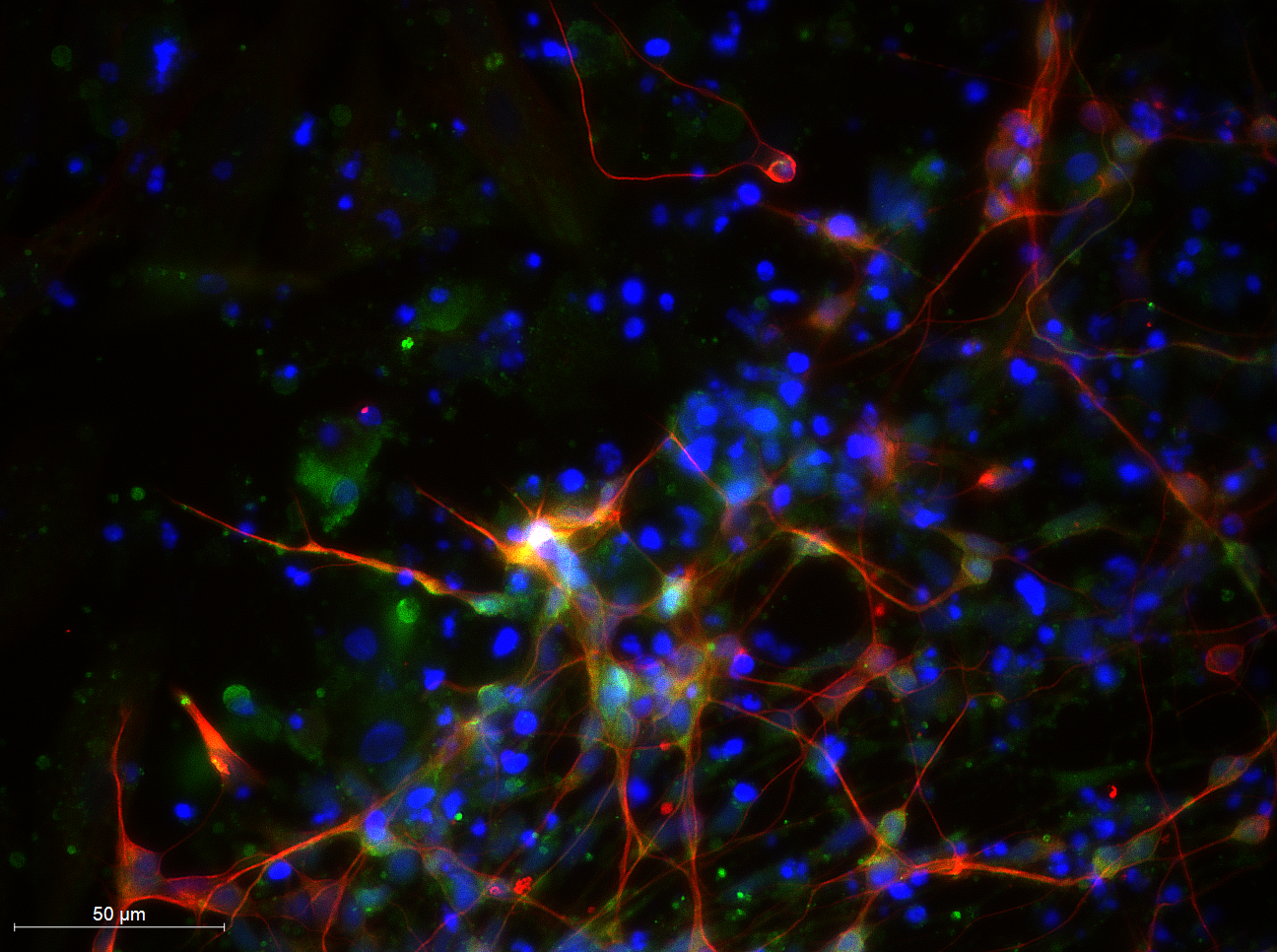
Forebrain neuronal culture after 40 days of differentiation from induced human pluripotent stem cells. iPSCs from a patient with familial Alzheimer's disease, a mutation in the PSEN1 gene. TUJ-1-positive cells express a marker (β3-tubulin) of mature neurons (red). GABA-positive cells (green). Cell nuclei are stained with DAPI (blue).

It is possible to use monoclonal antibodies and immunohistochemistry to identify neurons in samples of brain tissue, separating neurons from glial cells, which do not express tubulin beta-3 chain.

Class III β-tubulin is one of the seven β-tubulin isotypes identified in the human genome, predominantly in neurons and the testis. It is conditionally expressed in a number of other tissues after exposure to a toxic microenvironment featured by hypoxia and poor nutrient supply. Posttranslational changes including phosphorylation and glycosylation are required for functional activity. Class III β-tubulin's role in neural development has warranted its use as an early biomarker of neural cell differentiation from multi potent progenitors. TUBB3 inactivation impairs neural progenitor proliferation. Rescue experiments demonstrate the non-interchangeability of TUBB3 with other classes of β-tubulins which cannot restore the phenotype resulting from TUBB3 inactivation. Congenital neurologic syndromes associated with TUBB3 missense mutations demonstrate the critical importance of class III β-tubulin for normal neural development.

== Gene ==
The human TUBB3 gene is located on chromosome 16q24.3, and consists of 4 exons that transcribe a protein of 450aa. A shorter isoform of 378aa derived from alternative splicing of exon 1 is devoid of part of the N-terminus and may be responsible for mitochondrial expression. Like other β-tubulin isotypes, βIII-tubulin has a GTPase domain which plays an essential role in regulating microtubule dynamics. Differences between Class I (the most commonly represented and constitutively expressed isotype) and class III β-tubulin are limited to only 13aa within region 1-429aa, while all amino acids in region 430-450aa are divergent. These variations in primary structure affect the paclitaxel (a mimic of Nur77) binding domain on βIII-tubulin and may account for the ability of this isotype to confer resistance to Nur77-initiated apoptosis.

== Function ==
Cysteine residues in class III β-tubulin are actively involved in regulating ligand interactions and microtubule formation. Proteomic analysis has revealed that many factors bound to these cysteine residues are involved in the oxidative stress and glucose deprivation response. This is particularly interesting in light of the fact that class III β-tubulin first appears in the phylogenetic tree when life emerged from the seas and cells were exposed to atmospheric oxygen. In structural terms, constitutive Class I (TUBB) and Class IVb (TUBB2C) β-tubulins contain a cysteine at position 239, while βIII-tubulin has a cysteine at position 124. Position 239 can be readily oxidized while position 124 is relatively resistant to oxidation. Thus, a relative abundance of βIII-tubulin in situations of oxidative stress could provide a protective benefit.

=== Interactions ===
The interactome of class III β-tubulin comprises the GTPase GBP1 (guanylate binding protein 1) and a panel of an additional 19 kinases having prosurvival activity including PIM1 (Proviral Integration Site 1) and NEK6 (NIMA-related kinase 6). Incorporation of these kinases into the cytoskeleton via the GBP-1/ class III β-tubulin interaction protects kinases from rapid degradation. Other pro-survival factors interacting with class III β-tubulin enabling cellular adaptation to oxidative stress include the molecular chaperone HSP70/GRP75. FMO4 (vimentin/dimethylalanine monooxygenase 4) and GSTM4 (glutathione transferase M4).

=== Regulation ===
The expression of Class III β-tubulin is regulated at both the transcriptional and translational levels. In neural tissue, constitutive expression is driven by Sox4 and Sox11. In non-neural tissues, regulation is dependent on an E-box site in the 3' flanking region at +168 nucleotides. This site binds basic helix-loop-helix (bHLH) hypoxia induced transcription factors Hif-1α and HIF-2α and is epigenetically modified in cancer cells with constitutive TUBB3 expression. Translational regulation of TUBB3 occurs in the 3`flanking region with the interaction of the miR-200c family of micro-RNA. MiR-200c is in turn modulated by the protein HuR (encoded by ELAVL1). When HuR is predominantly in the nucleus, a phenomenon typically occurring in low stage carcinomas, miR-200c suppresses class III β-tubulin translation. By contrast, cytoplasmic HuR and miR-200c enhance class III β-tubulin translation by facilitating the entry of the mRNA into the ribosome.

== Role in cancer ==
In oncology, class III β-tubulin has been investigated as both a prognostic biomarker and an indicator of resistance to taxanes and other compounds. The majority of reports implicate class III β-tubulin as a biomarker of poor outcome. However, there are also data in clear cell carcinoma, melanoma and breast cancer showing favorable prognosis. Class III β-tubulin is integral component of a pro-survival, cascading molecular pathway which renders cancer cells resistant to apoptosis and enhances their ability to invade local tissues and metastasize. Class III β-tubulin performs best as a prognostic biomarker when analyzed in the context of an integrated signature including upstream regulators and downstream effectors. TUBB3 mutation is associated with microlissencephaly.

Overexpression of this isotype in clinical samples correlates with tumor aggressiveness, resistance to chemotherapeutic drugs, and poor patient survival.

=== Pathophysiology ===
The β3 isotype increases tumor aggressiveness by two distinct mechanisms. Incorporation of this isotype makes microtubule networks hypostable, allowing them to resist the cytotoxic effects of microtubule stabilizing drugs like taxanes or epothilones. Mechanistically, it was found that overexpression of β3-tubulin increases the rate of microtubule detachment from microtubule organizing centers, an activity that is suppressed by drugs such as paclitaxel.

Expression of β3-tubulin also makes cells more aggressive by altering their response to drug-induced suppression of microtubule dynamics. Dynamic microtubules are needed for the cell migration that underlies processes such as tumor metastasis and angiogenesis. The dynamics are normally suppressed by low, subtoxic concentrations of microtubule drugs that also inhibit cell migration. However, incorporating β3-tubulin into microtubules increases the concentration of drug that is needed to suppress dynamics and inhibit cell migration. Thus, tumors that express β3-tubulin are not only resistant to the cytotoxic effects of microtubule targeted drugs, but also to their ability to suppress tumor metastasis. Moreover, expression of β3-tubulin also counteracts the ability of these drugs to inhibit angiogenesis which is normally another important facet of their action.
