= Centromere protein T =

Centromere- and microtubule-associated protein

CENPT

Identifiers
- Aliases: CENPT, C16orf56, CENP-T, centromere protein T, SSMGA
- External IDs: OMIM: 611510; MGI: 2443939; GeneCards: CENPT

Gene location (Human)
Chr.	Chromosome 16 (human)
Band	16q22.1	Start	67,828,157 bp
Band	16q22.1	End	67,847,811 bp

Gene location (Mouse)
Chr.	Chromosome 8 (mouse)
Band	8|8 D3	Start	106,571,305 bp
Band	8|8 D3	End	106,579,910 bp
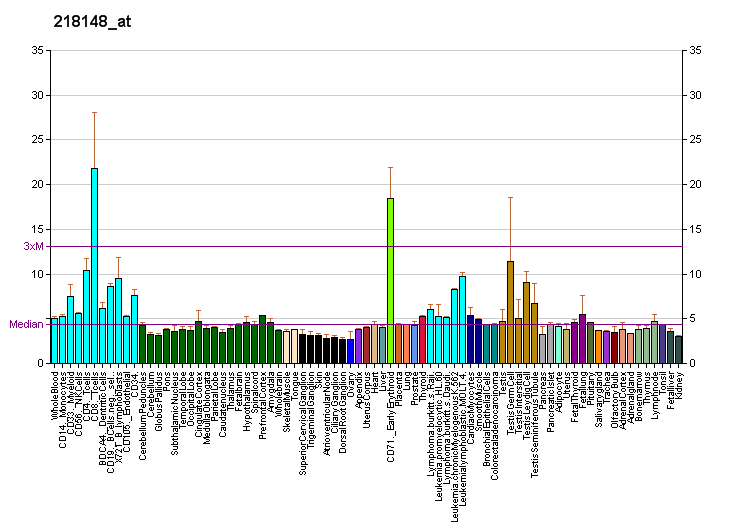
RNA expression pattern
Bgee	Human / Mouse (ortholog); Top expressed in: right hemisphere of cerebellum; right testis; left testis; skin of abdomen; skin of leg; granulocyte; right ovary; left ovary; body of pancreas; muscle layer of sigmoid colon / Top expressed in: yolk sac; endocardial cushion; internal carotid artery; external carotid artery; otic vesicle; endothelial cell of lymphatic vessel; ventricular zone; morula; blastocyst; maxillary prominence; More reference expression data
BioGPS	More reference expression data
Gene ontology
Molecular function	protein heterodimerization activity; protein binding; DNA binding; histone binding; DNA-binding transcription factor activity, RNA polymerase II-specific
Cellular component	cytosol; chromosome; nucleoplasm; chromosome, centromeric region; nucleus; kinetochore; nuclear body
Biological process	kinetochore assembly; CENP-A containing chromatin assembly; chromosome organization; chromosome segregation; cell division; cell cycle; protein localization to kinetochore involved in kinetochore assembly; mitotic cell cycle; regulation of transcription by RNA polymerase II
Sources:Amigo / QuickGO
Orthologs
Databases	NCBI: entry; OMA: entry
Species	Human	Mouse
Entrez	80152	320394
Ensembl	ENSG00000102901	ENSMUSG00000036672
UniProt	Q96BT3	Q3TJM4
RefSeq (mRNA)	NM_025082	NM_177150
RefSeq (protein)	NP_079358	NP_796124
Location (UCSC)	Chr 16: 67.83 – 67.85 Mb	Chr 8: 106.57 – 106.58 Mb
PubMed search
- Wikidata
View/Edit Human	View/Edit Mouse

Centromere protein T is a protein that in humans is encoded by the CENPT gene.

== Clinical significance ==
Mutations in CENPT cause an autosomal recessive syndrome of microcephaly, short stature, skeletal abnormalities, underdeveloped genitalia and pubertal delay.

== See also ==
- CENPE
- CENPF
- CENPJ
