= Tubulinopathies =

Autosomal dominant disorders that result in brain malformations

Tubulinopathies, also known as tubulin-related cortical dysgenesis, are a group of heterozygous autosomal dominant disorders that result in brain malformations caused by pathogenic variants of genes that encode tubulin.

Individuals diagnosed with tubulinopathies typically display altered brain morphology such as "classic" lissencephaly (a thickening of the cortex with a posterior-to-anterior gradient of severity), dysmorphic or hypertrophic basal ganglia (where these brain areas appear bulbous), and/or cerebellar hypoplasia/displasia. Clinically, these individuals present with motor and cognitive impairments as well as epilepsy. Mutations associated with tubulinopathies have been reported in several alpha- and beta-tubulin-encoding genes such as TUBA1A, TUBA8, TUBB2B, and TUBB3.

Recent genetic studies have shown that heterozygous, missense mutations in α- and β-tubulin isotypes are sporadic in individuals carrying mutations in TUBA1A, TUBB5, and TUBB2B. Whereas TUBB3 mutations can be familiar or de novo.

== Tubulins ==
Tubulin proteins are important building blocks of the cytoskeleton that provide mechanical support for cells and assist in protein trafficking and anchoring of protein and organelles. Tubulins are the structural subunit proteins that form microtubules. The eukaryotic tubulin superfamily consist of alpha-, beta-, gamma-, delta-, epsilon-, and zeta-tubulin. There exist several isotypes of tubulin that vary in the specific amino acid sequence, nucleotide sequences of untranslated regions, and tissue expression during different stages of development. Tubulin (and therefore microtubules) have the capacity to stochastically cycle between polymerization and depolymerization, a feature called "dynamic instability" which allows for regulation of assembly or disassembly. Modulation of tubulin and microtubule expression is further regulated by microtubule associated proteins (MAPs).

Disrupted MAP–tubulin interactions are often associated with developmental dysregulation of the brain and mutations in genes that encode these proteins form the genetic basis for tubulinopathies and the morphological features of the disorders.

== Clinical characteristics ==
=== Motor dysfunction ===
Due to the large heterogeneity in tubulinopathies impacting brain development, difficulties in motor control in individuals diagnosed with these disorders often vary clinically.

A case report by Geiger et al. reported a 31 year old Caucasian woman with myoclonus-dystonia carrying a TUBB2B mutation, presenting with an involuntary left head tilt and myoclonic jerks in the neck, trunk, and upper extremities, as well as high frequency tremors in the left hand. Neuroimaging showed asymmetric pachygyria and dysmorphic basal ganglia, and neurological tests were positive for mild cognitive impairment and skeletal anomalies.

In a 2025 retrospective study, Ikegawa and colleagues reviewed medical records of tubulinopathy patients treated at Kanagawa Children's Medical Center from January 2000 to May 2022. A substantial number of patients had no or delayed gait acquisition, and those with the TUBB4A variant were unable to walk and did not have neck stability, and were without speech. The authors suggested that cortical dysplasia in tubulinopathies may reflect a higher severity of developmental delay due to impaired neuronal migration.

A case review of several patients by Poirier et al. showed tubulinopathy patients often presented with axial hypotonia (reduced muscle tone in the neck and trunk) and spastic diplegia or tetraplegia (a subset of cerebral palsy that is defined by limb spasticity).

=== Cognitive impairment ===
Cognitive impairment in individuals with tubulinopathies is highly present, and, like motor symptoms, vary from patient to patient.

Because proper cytoskeletal arrangement in the developing brain is important for neuronal differentiation and migration, mutations in tubulin-encoding genes result in morphological abnormalities that contribute to neurological impairments.

For example, a case study presented by Yuen and colleagues discussed a 10-year old female that passed early developmental milestones, but intellectual disability was apparent at six years old and was two years behind her peers. Ultrasound during pregnancy noted antenatal microcephaly and by age ten was two standard-deviations below the mean for head circumference. The patient was reported to have a TUBG1 mutation. However, the neurological examination, other than the delayed milestones, were "otherwise unremarkable", with no motor deficits or epilepsy, and mild facial dysmorphia.

Another patient with a de novo TUBG1 mutation (reported by the same group) presented much differently, however. A 13-month old with noted microcephaly on ultrasound during pregnancy experienced a seizure with left-sided clonic activity and secondary bilateral synchrony and oxygen desaturation during the first hour of life. The patient continued to experience several seizures over the next few months generally associated with feeding. At 13 months, the patient was not yet rolling or sitting independently, but babbled and was able to visually fix and follow.

A meta-analysis performed by Pavone and colleagues noted several patients with TUBA1A mutations that presented with Hirschsprung disease and inappropriate antidiuretic hormone secretion, severe intellectual disability, and absence of language.

An animal model of a tubulinopathy found cognitive impairments and dysregulated neuronal excitability in mice exhibiting the brain dimple (brdp) mutation. Heterozygous Tubb2b^{brdp/+} mice showed impairments in learning, memory, and reduced long-term potentiation in the hippocampal CA1 region, as well as general morphological disruptions throughout the hippocampus.

=== Epilepsy ===
Epilepsies are common in individuals with tubulinopathies, the severity of which is determined by the specific mutated gene or pathogenic variant.

A case report by Romaniello and colleagues described six out of fifteen tubulinopathy patients (ages 4 to 56) presented with epileptic seizures which began with infantile epileptic spasms syndrome (also known as "West syndrome") that "evolved toward focal epilepsy" which was most often treated by sodium valproate. In a meta analysis, these authors noted that a significant amount of epilepsies were found in patients harboring mutations in TUBA1A or TUBB2B genes. Focal and spasm seizures were most common in these variants, while tonic-clonic seizures were found in 18 % and 13 % of patients that had mutations in TUBA1A or TUBB2B genes, respectively. Interestingly, seizure control was more successful in TUBB2B patients (at 72 %), but only 33 % in TUBA1A. In this literature review, patients harboring the TUBB3 mutation only presented with febrile seizures.

Another case report by Cushion et al. reported an individual with a de novo heterozygous TUBB2A mutation that presented with infantile spasms at 5 months of age, which was treated with topiramate. Upon MRI analysis, this patient showed simplified gyri and globular basal ganglia and thalami, among other anatomical abnormalities.

== Molecular determinants ==
Proper cytoskeletal arrangement during development is essential in determining the complex architecture of the brain, especially in neuronal migration, and disruptions in the normal functioning of these proteins leads to multiple neurological disorders. In tubulinopathies, mutations in genes that encode tubulin proteins result in a disruption in the ability for microtubules to exhibit dynamic instability (the cycling between states of polymerization and depolymerization), as free tubulins act as the "switches" between these states.

In the normal functioning protein, two GTP molecules bind at the intradimer space between α- and β-tubulin monomers (the "N" site), and one GTP molecule at the "E" site on β-tubulin. The E-site GTP is able to be hydrolyzed to GDP on microtubule assembly after the binding of a tubulin heterodimer, the binding of which contributes to microtubule dynamic instability. Because GTP-tubulin is more stable than GDP-tubulin, GTP-caps (a stable structure that prevents microtubule depolymerization) are added during microtubule assembly as tubulin heterodimers are added and hydrolysis continues until the GTP-cap is hydrolized, which triggers microtubule collapse and disassembly.

MAPs are also important in regulating and contributing to microtubule dynamics. Microtubule plus-end tracking proteins (+TIPs), a subclass of MAPs, assist in the polymerization of microtubules. For example, proteins in the XMAP215 family of +TIPs act as a microtubule polymerizer that is concentration-dependent. Another +TIP family of proteins called EB regulate microtubule polymerization, disassembly, and assembly. Kinesins, another subclass of MAPs, also assist in cytoskeletal trafficking by hydrolyzing ATP which moves structures (like other proteins) along microtubule "tracks", but can also regulate microtubule de/polymerization.

Tubulins and MAPs which drive regulation of microtubules are essential for neurodevelopment, as cytoskeletal arrangements assist in the proliferation, migration, and morphogenesis of early neurons and progenitor cells. Mutations in these proteins predictably lead to dysregulation in early stages of development. For example, LIS1, a MAP-encoding gene responsible for lissencephaly (a smoothing of the brain's surface), is an important co-localizer of dynein and dynactin that assists in neuronal radial migration and axon extension. Doublecortin, a MAP protein also associated with lissencephaly, assists in neuronal differentiation and migration. Interestingly, TUBB3, which encodes the neuron-specific β-tubulin isotype, is highly expressed during early neurodevelopment, but complete (Tubb3^{-/-}) murine knockouts show compensatory responses by other tubulin proteins as knockout animals lack morphological abnormalities. However, Tubb3 point mutations cause severe abnormal neurodevelopment, which suggests that this gene may act in a dominant manner. Mutations in the α-tubulin isotypes more frequently cause neurodevelopmental abnormalities, as many are temporally and spatially expressed. Consequently, Tuba1a^{-/-} is embryonic lethal, and fetal analysis shows increases in ventricular zone width and decreases in intermediate and cortical zone widths. An S140G mutation in Tuba1a was found to disrupt neuronal radial migration, a consequence of reduced GTP binding of tubule heterodimers.
