= TTC7A =

Protein-coding gene in the species Homo sapiens

Identifiers
- Aliases: TTC7A, MINAT, TTC7, GIDID, tetratricopeptide repeat domain 7A
- External IDs: OMIM: 609332; MGI: 1920999; GeneCards: TTC7A

Gene location (Human)
Chr.	Chromosome 2 (human)
Band	2p21	Start	46,916,157 bp
Band	2p21	End	47,076,137 bp

Gene location (Mouse)
Chr.	Chromosome 17 (mouse)
Band	17|17 E4	Start	87,590,314 bp
Band	17|17 E4	End	87,689,197 bp
RNA expression pattern
Bgee	Human / Mouse (ortholog); Top expressed in: sperm; right testis; left testis; tendon of biceps brachii; monocyte; granulocyte; thymus; pancreatic ductal cell; left adrenal cortex; right adrenal gland / Top expressed in: granulocyte; lip; otolith organ; lumbar spinal ganglion; utricle; mesenteric lymph nodes; duodenum; jejunum; right kidney; spermatid; More reference expression data
BioGPS	n/a
Orthologs
Databases	NCBI: entry; OMA: entry
Species	Human	Mouse
Entrez	57217	225049
Ensembl	ENSG00000068724	ENSMUSG00000036918
UniProt	Q9ULT0	Q8BGB2
RefSeq (mRNA)	NM_001288951; NM_001288953; NM_001288955; NM_020458	NM_028639
RefSeq (protein)	NP_001275880; NP_001275882; NP_001275884; NP_065191	NP_082915; NP_001391016; NP_001391017
Location (UCSC)	Chr 2: 46.92 – 47.08 Mb	Chr 17: 87.59 – 87.69 Mb
PubMed search
- Wikidata
View/Edit Human	View/Edit Mouse

Tetratricopeptide repeat domain 7A (TTC7A) is a protein that in humans is encoded by the TTC7A gene.

== Function ==
TPR domain-containing proteins, such as TTC7A, have diverse functions in cell cycle control, protein transport, phosphate turnover, and protein trafficking or secretion, and they can act as chaperones or scaffolding proteins.

== Clinical significance ==
TTC7A deficiency disrupts epithelial cell differentiation and polarization in the intestinal tract, thymus, and lungs. TTC7A deficiency is very rare with less than 80 cases described in the literature to date.

Mutations in this gene are known to cause intestinal atresia, severe infantile or very early onset inflammatory bowel disease, extensive enteropathy, combined immunodeficiencies, thyroid dysfunction, alopecia, and lung disease.

There is a broad spectrum of severity and variety of symptoms, although quality of life is generally very poor for these children with few surviving beyond the first year or two of life.

== Treatment ==
There is no standard treatment for TTC7A Deficiency at this time. Management of TTC7A deficiency currently entails bowel resection for any atresias, hematopoietic stem cell transplantation to correct the immunodeficiencies and immunosuppression to help alleviate bowel disease and immune disregulation. However, Hematopoietic stem cell transplantation is ineffective for resolving the intestinal disease Small bowel transplant has proven successful in at least one case.

=== Rho Kinase Inhibitors ===
Research indicates that TTC7A deficiency results in "increased Rho kinase activity which disrupts polarity, growth, and differentiation of intestinal epithelial cells, and which impairs immune cell homeostasis, thereby promoting MIA-CID development." Based on this research, it has been proposed that Rho kinase inhibitors may be a therapeutic option, although no specific rho kinase inhibitors are currently available for patient use with the exception of Fasudil which is only available in Japan. It has been shown that statins such as Lipitor are useful as Rho kinase inhibitors. Therefore, statins may be helpful for the treatment of TTC7A deficiency, although this has yet to be proven.

Recent research suggests that rho kinase inhibitors may be ineffective in treating TTC7A Deficiency.

=== Leflunomide As Potential Treatment ===
Recent research shows that Leflunomide reduces intestinal tract narrowing, restores gut motility, and increases intestinal cell survival in Zebrafish with TTC7A Deficiency. The researchers concluded that Leflunomide "might be repurposed for treatment of TTC7A deficiency."
