= Double bubble (radiology) =

Pattern seen in radiologic examinations

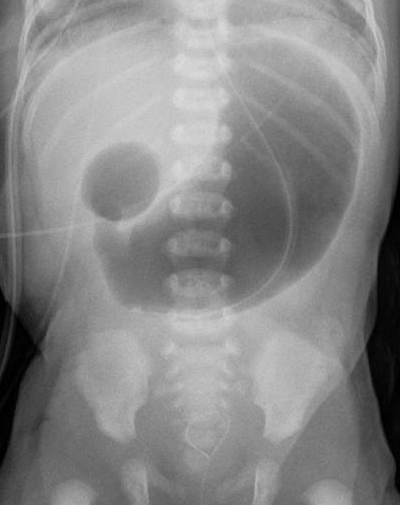
Frontal view of the abdomen with double bubble sign, patient was found to have duodenal atresia.

In radiology, the double bubble sign is a feature of pediatric imaging seen on radiographs or prenatal ultrasound in which two air filled bubbles are seen in the abdomen, representing two discontiguous loops of bowel in a proximal, or 'high,' small bowel obstruction. The finding is typically pathologic, and implies either duodenal atresia, duodenal web, annular pancreas, or on occasion midgut volvulus, a distinction that requires close clinical correlation and, in most cases, surgical intervention.

Distal gas is more often seen with midgut volvulus, duodenal stenosis and duodenal web, though this not always present. In such cases, distinguishing the diagnoses depends on clinical presentation.

== Follow up imaging ==
A fluoroscopic study known as an upper gastrointestinal series is often the next step in management in patients that are not critically ill, though if volvulus is suspected, emergent surgical intervention is mandated. If clinical findings are equivocal, caution with non water-soluble contrast is needed, as the usage of barium can impede surgical revision and lead to increased post operative complications. Non ionic water-soluble contrast should be used, as the hyperosmolar agents, if aspirated, can result in life-threatening pulmonary edema. When reflective of duodenal atresia, associations with Down syndrome and VACTERL sequence abnormalities are often seen.

== Mimics ==
Certain rare anatomic anomalies, such as congenital duodenal duplication and pyloric atresia can cause false positives for the sign on radiographs. Congenital pyloric atresia usually causes a single bubble on radiographs without distal gas, though an intermittent double bubble sign is occasionally seen. Duodenal atresia, while typically without distal gas, has been reported with an absent double bubble, though this variant is quite rare. On neonatal ultrasound, a double bubble can also be caused by a choledochal cyst, omental cyst, or enteric duplication cyst.
