= Gastric lavage =

Process of clearing the stomach contents

Gastric lavage, also commonly called stomach pumping or gastric washing or gastric suction, is the process of cleaning out the contents of the stomach using a tube. Since its first recorded use in the early 19th century, it has become one of the most routine means of eliminating poisons from the stomach. Such devices are normally used on a person who has ingested a poison or overdosed on a drug such as ethanol. They may also be used before surgery, to clear the contents of the digestive tract before it is opened.

Apart from toxicology, gastric lavage (or nasogastric lavage) is sometimes used to confirm levels of bleeding from the upper gastrointestinal tract. It may play a role in the evaluation of hematemesis. It can also be used as a cooling technique for hyperthermic patients.

== Technique ==
Gastric lavage involves the passage of a tube (such as an Ewald tube) via the mouth or nose down into the stomach followed by sequential administration and removal of small volumes of liquid. The placement of the tube in the stomach must be confirmed by pH testing a small amount of aspirated stomach contents, or x-ray. This is to ensure the tube is not in the lungs.

In adults, small amounts of warm water or saline are administered and, via a siphoning action, removed again. In children, normal saline is used, as children are more at risk of developing hyponatremia if lavaged with water. Because of the possibility of vomiting, a suction device is always on hand in case of pulmonary aspiration of stomach contents. Lavage is repeated until the returning fluid shows no further gastric contents.

If the patient is unconscious or cannot protect their airway then the patient should be intubated before performing lavage. The person must be anaesthetised for a period of time during the operation due to its high risk of shock and hyponatremia.

=== Indications ===
Gastric lavage is used infrequently in modern poisoning treatment. Some authorities have actually suggested that it not be used routinely, if ever, in poisoning situations. Lavage should only be considered if the amount of poison ingested is potentially life-threatening and the procedure can be performed within 60 minutes of ingestion. Lavage is also the initial treatment for duodenal atresia in newborns, a condition where the small intestine is closed distal to the stomach, causing food and fluid to accumulate in the stomach. When the body temperature rises above 40 °C, gastric lavage with iced saline also can be an aggressive cooling measure in a medical emergency.

=== Contraindications ===
Lavage is contraindicated when patients have a compromised, unprotected airway and in patients at risk of gastrointestinal hemorrhage or perforation. Relative contraindications include when the poisoning is due to a corrosive substance (strong acids or strong bases) (T54), hydrocarbons (T53), or for poisons that have an effective antidote.

== Complications ==
Many complications have been reported, although it appears serious complications are uncommon. The most dangerous risk is aspiration pneumonia, which is more likely to occur if hydrocarbons are ingested in patients without a protected airway. Other complications include laryngospasm, hypoxia, bradycardia, epistaxis, hyponatremia, hypochloremia, water intoxication, or mechanical injury to the stomach.
