= Annular pancreas =

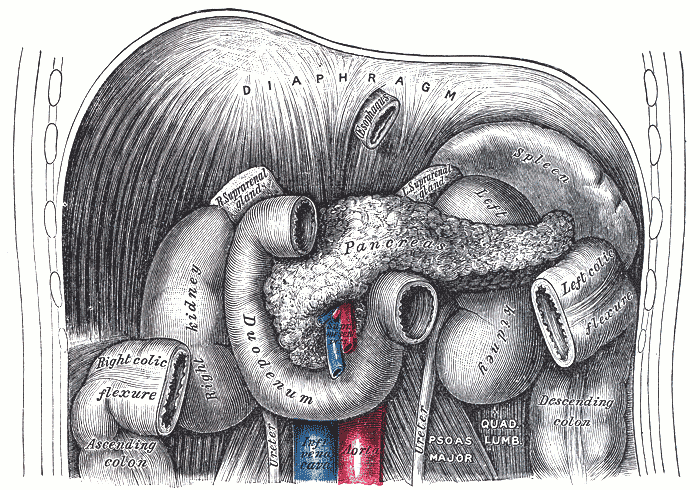
- Duodenum and pancreas (normal anatomy)
- Specialty: Medical genetics

Annular pancreas is a rare condition in which the second part of the duodenum is surrounded by a ring of pancreatic tissue continuous with the head of the pancreas. This portion of the pancreas can constrict the duodenum and block or impair the flow of food to the rest of the intestines. It is estimated to occur in 1 out of 12,000 to 15,000 newborns. The ambiguity arises from the fact that not all cases are symptomatic.

== Signs and symptoms ==
Early signs of abnormality include polyhydramnios (an excess of amniotic fluid), low birth weight, and feeding intolerance immediately after birth, in particular a tendency to develop epigastric distention associated with non-biliary vomiting (the obstruction is generally above the papilla of Vater, therefore superior to the junction with the bile ducts). Different chromosomal diseases (for example trisomy 21 and, with a minor frequency, trisomy 18 and trisomy 13) are present in about 33% of subjects affected by annular pancreas.

== Causes ==
When ventral pancreatic bud splits and encircles the duodenum leads to a construction in the duodenum

== Diagnosis ==
Postnatal diagnostic procedures include abdominal x-ray and ultrasound, CT scan, and upper GI and small bowel series. Abdominal radiography can show the classic sign of the "double bubble": the presence of air in the stomach and duodenum. Unfortunately, this double-bubble sign is not pathognomonic for annular pancreas, as it can also be observed in other conditions, such as duodenal atresia and intestinal malrotation. Upper GI series may be suggestive of annular pancreas, especially if they show a duodenal narrowing of the second portion of the duodenum and the concomitant dilatation of the proximal duodenum. In some cases it is possible to have signs of inverse peristalsis of the duodenal tract which is proximal to the narrowing caused by the annular pancreas, and the dilatation of the duodenal portion distal to the anomaly. An abdominal CT scan or an MRI allows to highlight the narrowing of the descending duodenal tract and the ring of pancreatic tissue surrounding the duodenum: this ring can be complete or, in patients with an incomplete annular pancreas, extended in a postero-lateral or anterolateral direction with respect to the second part of the duodenum. ERCP or MRCP with secretin allow precise delineation of the anatomical structure and in particular a good visualization of pancreatic ducts, as well as a careful analysis of pancreatic secretion into the duodenum lumen.

== Treatment ==
In neonates, treatment for relief of obstruction usually is bypassing the obstructed segment of duodenum by duodeno-jejunostomy. In adults, due to the minor duodenal mobility, the approach is laparoscopic gastrojejunostomy or duodenojejunostomy.
