= Duodenal atresia =

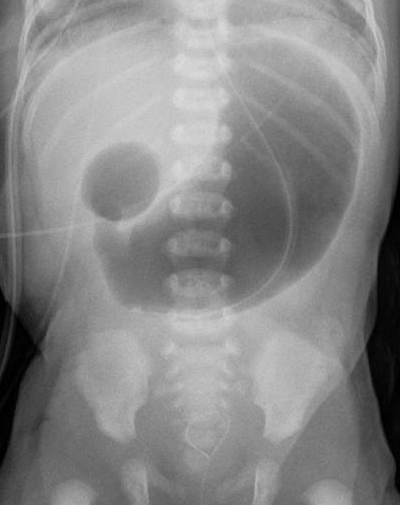
- Radiograph of abdomen with double-bubble sign from duodenal atresia
- Specialty: Pediatric gastroenterology, Pediatric surgery
- Symptoms: Antenatal period: polyhydramnios Neonatal period: bilious or non-bilious vomiting within first 36 hours of life, abdominal distension, lack of stooling
- Usual onset: During embryological development
- Causes: Unknown
- Risk factors: Down syndrome
- Differential diagnosis: annular pancreas, duodenal stenosis
- Treatment: nasogastric suction, surgery (duodenoduodenostomy or duodenojejunostomy)
- Frequency: 0.005%

Duodenal atresia is the congenital absence or complete closure of a portion of the lumen of the duodenum. It causes increased levels of amniotic fluid during pregnancy (polyhydramnios) and intestinal obstruction in newborn babies. Newborns present with bilious or non-bilous vomiting (depending on where in the duodenum the obstruction is) within the first 24 to 48 hours after birth, typically after their first oral feeding. Radiography shows a distended stomach and distended duodenum, which are separated by the pyloric valve, a finding described as the double-bubble sign.

Treatment includes suctioning out any fluid that is trapped in the stomach, providing fluids intravenously, and surgical repair of the intestinal closure.

== Signs and symptoms ==
=== History and physical examination ===
During pregnancy, duodenal atresia is associated with increased amniotic fluid in the uterus, which is called polyhydramnios. This increase in amniotic fluid is caused by the inability of the fetus to swallow the amniotic fluid and absorb it in their digestive tract.

After birth, duodenal atresia may cause abdominal distension, especially of the upper abdomen. Bilious or non-bilious vomiting, depending on the position of the atresia in relation to the Ampulla of Vater, commonly occurs within the first day of life.

=== Associated conditions ===
Approximately 20–40 percent of all infants with duodenal atresia have Down syndrome and 50% have a congenital cardiac anomaly. Approximately 8% of infants with Down syndrome have duodenal atresia.

== Diagnosis ==
=== Imaging ===
==== Antenatal ====
Antenatal ultrasonography allows for earlier detection and diagnosis of duodenal atresia. The duodenum is not typically filled with fluid on imaging, however if fluid is visualized on ultrasound, this may suggest duodenal atresia as it causes obstruction and fluid may not pass distal to the atretic area. Early diagnosis of duodenal atresia provides time for clinicians to provide prenatal counseling and prepare for postnatal management.

==== Postnatal ====
The diagnosis of duodenal atresia is usually confirmed by radiography. An X-ray of the abdomen is the first step in evaluation. The x-ray should be obtained after placement of a nasogastric tube (feeding tube), evacuating the stomach and filling 40-50 ml of air to demonstrate two large air filled spaces, the so-called "double bubble" sign. The air is trapped in the stomach and proximal duodenum, which are separated by the pyloric sphincter, creating the appearance of two bubbles visible on x-ray. Since the closure of the duodenum is complete in duodenal atresia, no air is seen in the distal duodenum. Note that the double bubble sign is typically pathologic however it is not specific for duodenal atresia and may indicate other pathologies such as annular pancreas or midgut volvulus. A limited upper gastrointestinal series using barium contrast can be used to differentiate between duodenal atresia and midgut volvulus.

== Causes ==
The cause of duodenal atresia is not known. Dr. Julius Tandler hypothesized in 1900 that the etiology of duodenal atresia was due to occlusion of the duodenal lumen and failure to re-canalize during embryological development. Research surrounding duodenal atresia in recent years has switched focus to the fibroblast growth factor pathway in mouse models as Tandler's original hypothesis was unable to account for the different types of duodenal atresia.

== Diagnosis ==
=== Classification ===
Duodenal atresia is classified into 3 types:

- Type 1: the most common form of duodenal atresia, making up 92% of cases. A web made of mucosa and submucosa obstructs the duodenal lumen however there are no defects in the muscle coat.
- Type 2: rarest form of duodenal atresia, making up 1% of cases. The proximal and distal ends of the duodenum are atretic and separated but are connected by a cord (mesentery still intact).
- Type 3: makes up 7% of duodenal atresia cases. The ends of the duodenum are atretic without any tissue attachment (mesentery defect).
- Proposed New Classification
- Type 1: Duodenal web/membrane
- Type 1a: Complete duodenal web/membrane
- Type 1b: Fenestrated duodenalweb/membrane
- Type 2: Two blind ends of duodenum with intact mesentery and separated by a fibrous cord
- Type 3: Two blind ends of duodenum with a V-shaped defect in the mesentery
- Type 4: Multiple duodenal atresia/webs

== Management ==
Early treatment includes removing fluids from the stomach via a nasogastric tube, and providing fluids intravenously. The definitive treatment for duodenal atresia is surgery (duodenoduodenostomy or duodenojejunostomy), which may be performed openly or laparoscopically. The surgery is required but not immediately urgent - a 24 to 48-hour delay is permissible to facilitate transport, further evaluation and fluid resuscitation. The initial repair has a 5 percent morbidity and mortality rate. Nasogastric suction is typically continued post-operatively and patients can be transitioned to small oral feeds once nasogastric tube output decreases significantly or stops completely.

=== Complications ===
Prognosis is usually very good, although complications are more likely to occur when there are serious congenital anomalies. Complications from surgical repair include Peptic ulcer disease, Gastroesophageal reflux disease, Cholecystitis, Esophagitis, Megaduodenum, Blind loop syndrome, and anastomotic leak. Late complications may occur in about 12 percent of patients with duodenal atresia, and the mortality rate for these complications is 6 percent.

== Epidemiology ==
Duodenal atresia occurs in 1 in every 10,000 live births and is the most common intestinal atresia, constituting up to 60% of intestinal atresias.
