= TPL =

TPL may refer to:

== Biology and chemistry ==
- Thromboplastin
- Time-Place learning

== Companies and organizations ==
- Tallinn French School (Estonian: Tallinna Prantsuse Lütseum)
- Terumo Penpol, a subsidiary of Terumo Corp., Japan
- Texas Pacific Land Trust
- The Trust for Public Land
- Toronto Public Library
- Touch Paper Lane, a gang located in North London, Great Britain

== Computers ==
- Table Producing Language, an IBM mainframe computer program, superseded by TPL Tables
  - TPL Tables, commercial product that supersedes Table Producing Language
- Targeted peripheral list, part of USB On-The-Go
- Task Parallel Library, a component of the managed Parallel FX Library from Microsoft
- Temporal Process Language

== Transportation and logistics ==
- Trasporti Pubblici Luganesi, the public (bus) transportation system in Lugano, Switzerland
- Third-party logistics
- Towed pinger locator, used in underwater search for missing aircraft

== Other uses ==
- Transmission-line pulse
- Third party liability (disambiguation)
- Third-party logistics, use of third-party businesses to outsource elements of a company's distribution, warehousing, and fulfillment services
