= Semantic spacetime =

Semantic spacetime is a conceptual framework for agent-based modelling of spacetime, based on Promise Theory. Initially described as a model of computer science and an alternative network-based formulation of physics in some areas, it has also become a tool for knowledge representation in AI/LLM contexts.

In the context of knowledge representation, Semantic Spacetime is described as `a powerful conceptual framework for representing knowledge and relationships in a graph structure that draws inspiration from physics. Just as physical reality is described through spacetime coordinates and causal relationships, semantic spacetime provides a way to organize knowledge in a multi-dimensional representation where meaning emerges from relationships between entities.'

Semantic Spacetime was introduced by physicist and computer scientist Mark Burgess, in a series of papers called Spacetimes with Semantics, as a practical alternative to describing space and time, initially for Computer Science. It attempts to unify both quantitative and qualitative aspects of spacetime processes into a single model. This is referred to by Burgess as covering both “dynamics and semantics”. Promise theory is used as a representation for semantics. Directed adjacency is the graph theoretic logical primitive, but with the caveat that each node must both emit and absorb adjacency relations, cooperatively, similar to the unitary structure of quantum probabilities and transitions. Thus space is made up of cooperating nodes and edges. The representation of spacetime becomes a form of labelled graph, specifically built from promise theoretic bindings.

== Origins ==
Semantic Spacetime originates from Promise Theory. The traditional view of spacetime seems to have no relevance to phenomena in computing, electronics, biology, or many other information based processes. The classical understanding of spacetime from Newton's era is based on ballistics, the idea about space and time was that of a purely passive theatre for the motion and behaviours of material bodies. Einstein partially changed that perception with General Relativity, in which spacetime geometry is an active participant with its own properties, i.e. curvature, energy, and mass. In the process models of Computer Science, Electronics, Biology, and Logistics, however, space is formed from functional components that act more like service providers. Processes are representations of autonomous modular outcomes, a result of information passing between agents in networks of such active components, with a certain strength of coupling.

Burgess also observed a relationship between semantic knowledge representations and the bigraphs of Robin Milner, but found existing languages excessively formal and lacking in expressibility. In Semantic Spacetime one uses the language of Promise Theory to formulate a process (spacetime) model for autonomous agents. The property of autonomy becomes closely linked to locality in physics, so the approach has an appeal to universality.

== Relationship to other models ==
Burgess has stated that Semantic Spacetime is an attempt to demystify the explanation of certain phenomena in both physics and information science. "Until we can get past the prejudices of classical separation of science into disciplines we will not make progress in understanding computer systems at enormous scale".

In 2019, Burgess wrote an extended book about the idea called ‘’Smart Spacetime’’ to encourage interest in the approach and explain the vision behind Semantic Spacetime, and made a documentary video. The book goes further in pointing out `deep connections’ to other fields of science, suggesting a multi-disciplinary viewpoint. Commentators have likened the idea to other graph theoretic models of spacetime, such as Causal Sets, Quantum Graphity and the Wolfram Physics Project, however Burgess emphasizes key differences that go beyond the obvious use of graphs for modelling space in these writings.

In physics, spacetime is a purely quantitative description of metric properties, labelled by coordinates to map out a region or a volume; but in Information Sciences spacetime may also have semantics, or ‘’qualitative’’ functional aspects, which arise as the container of active processes. These also need to be included in descriptions of phenomena. Classically, the role is separated from space and time, but this may add layers of unwanted complexity as there are hidden assumptions behind a model of spacetime.

For example, one region of space might be a factory, while another could be a river. In biology, cells are regions of spacetime that play different roles in an organism, and organs are larger regions composed of many cells. Regions of spacetime thus take of the role of agents, and a full description of the topology and dynamics of these may be required to model the behaviour of the whole. Semantic spacetime doesn't distinguish between space and matter, it treats matter as a local property of the spacetime network of agents.

== Reception and usage ==
Burgess describes Semantic Spacetime as an idea in its infancy, with much work left to do, attracting a small amount of interest mainly from deep specialists. In a number of papers, he has developed applications of the idea mainly in the design of technology systems. In interviews he states that some documents, pertaining to technology, are proprietary and thus cannot be published or referenced.

Semantic Spacetime model and Promise Theory were references as an approach to multi-model database design and Resource Description Framework embedding for ArangoDB.

Limited papers on smart data pipelines and consistent propagation of information have been based on semantic spacetime and led to startups Aljabr and Dianemo to develop the respective technologies. It has also been the subject of much interest for understanding 5G telecommunications, especially in China.

Applications of the model to neuroscience and machine learning were recognized by an invitation to a special closed event salon in October 2022 by the Kavli Foundation (United States).

== Virtual Motion and Sociophysics ==
Semantic Spacetime identifies three ways in which motion can be understood for a graph. These are called Motion of the First, Second, and Third kinds. Burgess writes that `The semantics of ordinary space and time are diverse in interpretation. For space, we think of distance, trajectory, adjacency (topology), neighbourhood, continuity, direction, etc. For time, we have clock time, duration, time of day, partial ordering, etc.’. Semantic spacetime unifies these in promise theoretic (and thus graph theoretic) language.

The notion of Semantic Spacetime allows phenomena in Cloud computing to be viewed as a form of virtual physics, in which processes and properties (such as data records) can move around from host to host as moving promises. A description of this in terms of Promise Theory and Semantic Spacetime has been developed in a series of papers called Motion of the Third Kind. Burgess has claimed that we should expect to "rediscover physics again in the cloud".

Trust is the underlying measure of promise keeping in Promise Theory. Semantic Spacetime has also been used as an agent-based model for sociophysics in which trust plays a role similar to that of energy in ordinary mechanics.

== Tutorial series ==
A tutorial series with programming examples was published under the name "Semantic Spacetime and Data Analytics". A video documentary called Bigger, Faster, Smarter was also produced.
