= Ambient calculus =

In computer science, the ambient calculus is a process calculus devised by Luca Cardelli and Andrew D. Gordon in 1998, and used to describe and theorise about concurrent systems that include mobility. Here mobility means both computation carried out on mobile devices (i.e. networks that have a dynamic topology), and mobile computation (i.e. executable code that is able to move around the network). The ambient calculus provides a unified framework for modeling both kinds of mobility. It is used to model interactions in such concurrent systems as the Internet.

Since its inception, the ambient calculus has grown into a family of closely related ambient calculi.

== Informal description ==
=== Ambients ===
The fundamental primitive of the ambient calculus is the ambient. An ambient is informally defined as a bounded place in which computation can occur. The notion of boundaries is considered key to representing mobility, since a boundary defines a contained computational agent that can be moved in its entirety. Examples of ambients include:

- a web page (bounded by a file)
- a virtual address space (bounded by an addressing range)
- a Unix file system (bounded within a physical volume)
- a single data object (bounded by “self”)
- a laptop (bounded by its case and data ports)

The key properties of ambients within the Ambient calculus are:

- Ambients have names, which are used to control access to the ambient.
- Ambients can be nested inside other ambients (representing, for example, administrative domains)
- Ambients can be moved as a whole.

=== Operations ===
Computation is represented as the crossing of boundaries, i.e. the movement of ambients. There are four basic operations (or capabilities) on ambients:

- $in\;m.P$ instructs the surrounding ambient to enter some sibling ambient $m$, and then proceed as $P$
- $out\;m.P$ instructs the surrounding ambient to exit its parent ambient $m$
- $open\;m.P$ instructs the surrounding ambient to dissolve the boundary of an ambient $m$ located at the same level
- $copy\;m.$ makes any number of copies of something $m$

The ambient calculus provides a reduction semantics that formally defines what the results of these operations are.

Communication within (i.e. local to) an ambient is anonymous and asynchronous. Output actions release names or capabilities into the surrounding ambient. Input actions capture a value from the ambient, and bind it to a variable. Non-local I/O can be represented in terms of these local communications actions by a variety of means. One approach is to use mobile “messenger” agents that carry a message from one ambient to another (using the capabilities described above). Another approach is to emulate channel-based communications by modeling a channel in terms of ambients and operations on those ambients. The three basic ambient primitives, namely in, out, and open are expressive enough to simulate name-passing channels in the π-calculus.

== See also ==
- Lambda calculus
- Mobile membranes
- Type theory
- API-Calculus
