= Patrick Hanratty =

Patrick Hanratty is the name of:

- Patrick J. Hanratty, (born c. 1941), computer scientist and businessman
- Patrick Hanratty (bishop), 17th-century Roman Catholic Bishop of Dromore and Bishop of Down and Connor

== See also ==
- Pat Hanratty, politician
