= Faron Moller =

British computer scientist

Faron Moller FLSW FBCS FIMA
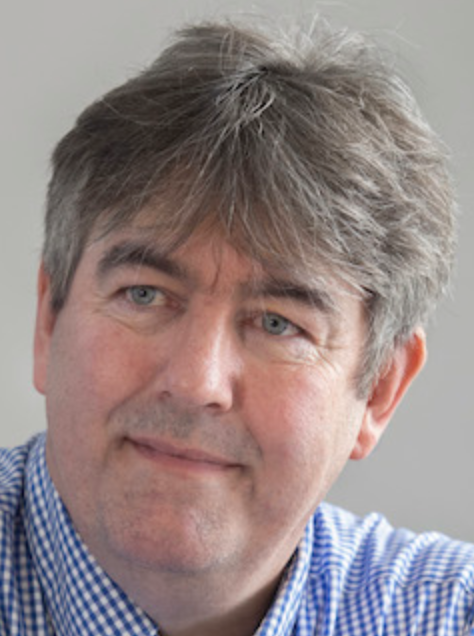
- Faron Moller
- Born: Faron George Moller; 25 February 1962 (age 64); Trail, British Columbia, Canada
- Education: University of British Columbia (BSc); University of Waterloo (MMath); University of Edinburgh (PhD)
- Scientific career
- Fields: Theoretical computer science
- Workplaces: Swansea University; University of Strathclyde; University of Edinburgh; Swedish Institute for Computer Science; Royal Institute of Technology; Uppsala University
- Thesis: Axioms for Concurrency (1989)
- Doctoral advisor: Robin Milner
- Website: www.swansea.ac.uk/staff/f.g.moller

Faron George Moller (born February 25, 1962, in Trail, British Columbia) is a Canadian-born British computer scientist and expert on theoretical computer science, particularly infinite-state automata theory and temporal logic. His work has focussed on structural decomposition techniques for analysing abstract models of computing systems. He is founding director of the Swansea Railway Verification Group; Director of Technocamps; and Head of the Institute of Coding in Wales. In 2023, he was elected General Secretary of the Learned Society of Wales.

== Education ==
Moller studied mathematics and computer science as an undergraduate at the University of British Columbia, and then as a Masters student at the University of Waterloo, before going on to do a PhD supervised by Robin Milner in the Laboratory for Foundations of Computer Science at the University of Edinburgh.

== Career and research ==
Moller has held posts at the University of Strathclyde, University of Edinburgh, The Swedish Institute for Computer Science, The Royal Institute of Technology in Stockholm, and Uppsala University before moving to Wales as Professor of Computer Science at Swansea University in 2000.

Moller serves as director of Technocamps, a pan-Wales schools outreach programme aimed at introducing and reinforcing Computer Science and Digital Competency within all Welsh schools and inspiring young people to study computing-based topics; and Head of the Institute of Coding in Wales.

=== Awards and honours ===
Moller is a Fellow of the Learned Society of Wales (FLSW), a Fellow of the British Computer Society ( FBCS) and Fellow of the Institute of Mathematics and its Applications (FIMA), and served as President of the British Colloquium for Theoretical Computer Science for 15 years (2004–2019). He is a Chartered Mathematician, a Chartered Scientist, and a Chartered IT Professional.
