= LFCS =

LFCS may refer to:

- Laboratory for Foundations of Computer Science, a research institute in Edinburgh, Scotland
- Linux Foundation Certified System Administrator, a certification program of the Linux Foundation
