= Stochastic probe =

In process calculus a stochastic probe is a measurement device that measures the time between arbitrary start and end events over a stochastic process algebra model.
