= Business Process Modeling Language =

Language and format for business process modeling

Business Process Modeling Language (BPML) is an XML-based language for business process modeling. It was maintained by the Business Process Management Initiative (BPMI) until June 2005 when BPMI and Object Management Group announced the merger of their respective business process management activities to form the Business Modeling and Integration Domain Task Force. It is deprecated since 2008. BPML was useful to OMG in order to enrich UML with process notation.

== History ==
BPML, a superset of BPEL, was implemented by early stage vendors, such as Intalio Inc., but incumbents such as IBM and Microsoft did not implement BPML in their existing workflow and integration engine implementations like BizTalk or WebSphere. They pushed for the simpler language BPEL.

In view of the lack of market acceptance, the BPMI dropped support of BPML in favor of BPEL4WS. Following the merger of BPMI and OMG, BPML has been definitively deprecated in 2008, with OMG's adoption of BPDM.

== Application ==
BPML was designed as a formally complete language, able to model any process, and, via a business process management system, deployed as an executable software process without generation of any software code. This is not possible with BPEL, since BPEL is not a complete process language. In practice BPEL is often used in conjunction with Java to fill in the "missing" semantics. In addition, BPEL is often tied to proprietary implementations of workflow or integration broker engines. Whereas, BPML was designed, and implemented, as a pure concurrent and distributed processing engine. It was designed to be semantically complete according to the Pi-calculus formal representation of computational processes.

BPEL and BPML are examples of a trend towards process-oriented programming. BPEL and BPML herald the concept of a BPMS as an IT capability for management of business processes, playing a role similar to a RDBMS for business data.

== See also ==
- Business Process Execution Language
- Business Process Model and Notation
- Business process modeling
- Workflow
- Workflow engine
