= Jos Baeten =

Dutch computer scientist

Josephus C.M. Baeten
- Born: Tilburg
- Awards: Officer of the Order of Orange-Nassau

Academic background
- Education: University of Minnesota
- Doctoral advisor: Wayne Richter

Academic work
- Discipline: Computer science, mathematics
- Institutions: Eindhoven University of Technology, University of Amsterdam, Centrum Wiskunde & Informatica

Josephus C.M. Baeten (born 15 June 1954) is a Dutch computer scientist and mathematician, who has published on process calculus, concurrency theory, formal methods, model-based software engineering, model-based systems engineering and theory of computation.

== Early life and education ==
Jos Baeten was born in Tilburg. He received his Ph.D. from the University of Minnesota in 1985, advised by Wayne Richter.

== Career ==
He was a researcher at Centrum Wiskunde & Informatica (CWI) and the University of Amsterdam until 1991, when he was appointed as a full professor at the Eindhoven University of Technology. There, he was professor at the Department of Mathematics and Computer Science from 1991 until 2015 (in two periods, he was dean of the department), and professor at the Department of Mechanical Engineering from 2010 until 2012. In 2011, he returned to CWI as its director, and in 2015, he returned to the University of Amsterdam as professor of theory of computing at the Institute of Logic, Language and Computation. He retired from both positions in 2020, and at that time became a CWI Fellow.

Baeten chaired the steering committee of the CONCUR conferences 1991-2018 and was president of ERCIM 2018-2019. Since 2010, he is a member of the Koninklijke Hollandsche Maatschappij der Wetenschappen.

During the 75th anniversary of CWI, he received a royal decoration of Officer in the Order of Orange-Nassau.
