= Patrick J. Hanratty =

American computer scientist and businessperson (1931–2019)

- Born: March 5, 1931
- Died: July 28, 2019 (aged 88)
- Education: University of California, Irvine
- Known for: computer-aided design and computer-aided manufacturing
- Spouse: Sandra
- Scientific career
- Fields: computer science
- Workplaces: General Electric, General Motors Research Laboratories, Manufacturing and Consulting Services

Patrick J. Hanratty (March 5, 1931 - July 28, 2019) was an American computer scientist and businessperson, commonly referred to as the "Father of CAD/CAM"—computer-aided design and computer-aided manufacturing. Up to 2013, he was president and CEO of Manufacturing and Consulting Services (MCS) of Scottsdale, Arizona, a company he founded. According to MCS, "70 percent of all 3-D mechanical CAD/CAM systems available today trace their roots back to Hanratty’s original code," although that statistic is not substantiated elsewhere.

== Early career ==
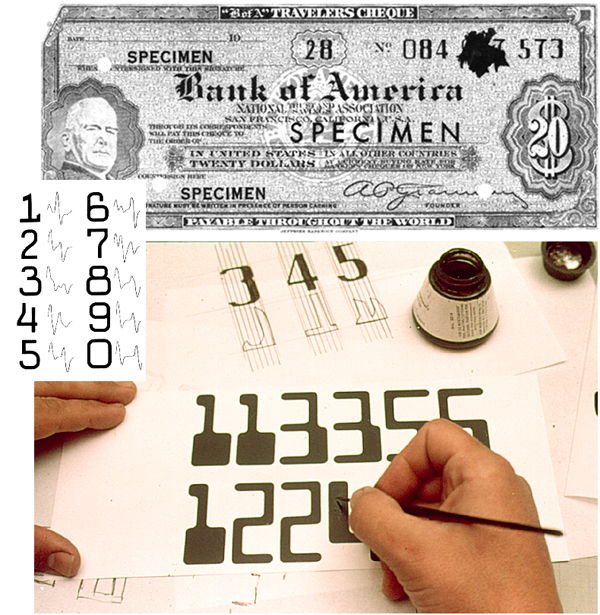
Magnetic ink character recognition (MICR) at SRI International

Hanratty worked for General Electric, where in 1957 he wrote Pronto, an early commercial numerical control (NC) programming language. Then he moved in 1961 to General Motors Research Laboratories, where his projects focused on NC software and taking complex surfaces and producing toolpath data for NC machines. He earned a PhD from the University of California, Irvine in 1977.

== Banking standard ==
Around the mid-1950s Hanratty and a team from the Stanford Research Institute using equipment built by the General Electric Computer Laboratory developed standardized machine-readable characters for use on bank checks. Adopted by the American Bankers Association in 1958, their characters are still in use and magnetic ink character recognition (MICR) and the E-13B font became standard in the industry.

== Business ==
In 1970 he cofounded the company Integrated Computer Systems (ICS) with seven of his coworkers from Astronautics Corporation, which had been acquired by McDonnell Douglas. Hanratty later said, "Never generate anything closely coupled to a specific architecture. And make sure you keep things open to communicate with other systems, even your competitors." ICS failed because its product, a CAD/CAM drafting system, was tied to a computer that few people had available, and because its product was written in TPL, an unfamiliar language for most people.

In 1971 Hanratty founded Manufacturing and Consulting Services (MCS), applying what he had learned at ICS. All the software was written in Fortran and it ran on almost any computer. His product was named Automated Drafting and Machining (ADAM), later AD-2000, and still later Anvil-4000. Annual revenue peaked at about $20 million in 1989 with almost 200 employees.

Among well-known customers of MCS were Computervision who licensed Adam for CADDS, Gerber Scientific for IDS 3, McDonnell Douglas who licensed it for Unigraphics. and Control Data Corporation who licensed it for development of ICEM/DDN. Several well-known CAD/CAM packages were developed from MCS products. Among them were Auto-Grapl, Autosnap 3D, Anvil-5000, and Intelligent Modeler.

Auto-Grapl in particular demonstrates what Hanratty had learned: "the computer writes the program for you".

== Personal life ==
Hanratty was married to Sandra and they had 3 children and 13 grandchildren. He died July 28, 2019.
