= Davide Sangiorgi =

- Education: University of Edinburgh (PhD)
- Scientific career
- Fields: Computer science
- Workplaces: University of Bologna
- Thesis: Expressing mobility in process algebras: first-order and higher-order paradigms (1993)
- Doctoral advisor: Robin Milner
- Website: www.cs.unibo.it/~sangio/

Davide Sangiorgi is an Italian professor of computer science at the University of Bologna. He has previously held research positions at the University of Edinburgh and at Inria. He received his PhD from the University of Edinburgh under the supervision of Robin Milner in 1993. He has had visiting positions at the Centrum Wiskunde & Informatica (CWI, Amsterdam), University of Cambridge, and University of Oxford.

His research interests are in the fields of concurrent systems, semantics and formal verification techniques.

He is a member, and past chairman, of IFIP Working Group 2.2 on the formal description of programming concepts, and a member of Academia Europaea. He is the head of the Research Team FOCUS, a joint laboratory between the University of Bologna and Inria.
