= Bigraph =

A bigraph can be modelled as the superposition of a graph (the link graph) and a set of trees (the place graph).

Each node of the bigraph is part of a graph and also part of some tree that describes how the nodes are nested. Bigraphs can be conveniently and formally displayed as diagrams. They have applications in the modelling of distributed systems for ubiquitous computing and can be used to describe mobile interactions. They have also been used by Robin Milner in an attempt to subsume Calculus of Communicating Systems (CCS) and π-calculus. They have been studied in the context of category theory.

== Anatomy of a bigraph ==
Aside from nodes and (hyper-)edges, a bigraph may have associated with it one or more regions which are roots in the place forest, and zero or more holes in the place graph, into which other bigraph regions may be inserted. Similarly, to nodes we may assign controls that define identities and an arity (the number of ports for a given node to which link-graph edges may connect). These controls are drawn from a bigraph signature. In the link graph we define inner and outer names, which define the connection points at which coincident names may be fused to form a single link.

== Foundations ==
A bigraph is a 5-tuple:

$(V,E,ctrl,prnt,link) : \langle k,X \rangle \to \langle m,Y \rangle,$

where $V$ is a set of nodes, $E$ is a set of edges, $ctrl$ is the control map that assigns controls to nodes, $prnt$ is the parent map that defines the nesting of nodes, and $link$ is the link map that defines the link structure.

The notation $\langle k,X \rangle \to \langle m,Y \rangle$ indicates that the bigraph has $k$ holes (sites) and a set of inner names $X$ and $m$ regions, with a set of outer names $Y$. These are respectively known as the inner and outer interfaces of the bigraph.

Formally speaking, each bigraph is an arrow in a symmetric partial monoidal category (usually abbreviated spm-category) in which the objects are these interfaces. As a result, the composition of bigraphs is definable in terms of the composition of arrows in the category.

== Extensions and variants ==
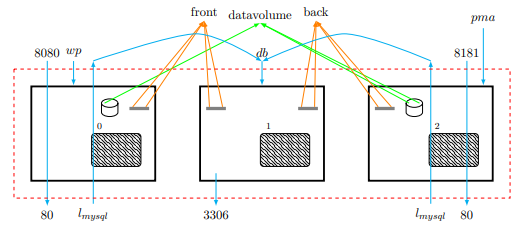
A directed bigraph modelling a container system.

=== Directed Bigraphs ===
Directed Bigraphs are a generalisation of bigraphs where hyper-edges of the link-graph are directed. Ports and names of the interfaces are extended with a polarity (positive or negative) with the requirement that the direction of hyper-edges goes from negative to positive.

Directed bigraphs were introduced as a meta-model for describing computation paradigms dealing with locations and resource communication where a directed link-graph provides a natural description of resource dependencies or information flow. Examples of areas of applications are security protocols, resource access management, and cloud computing.

=== Bigraphs with sharing ===
Example bigraph with sharing in which the node of control M is shared by the two nodes of control S. This is represented by M being in the intersection of the two S-nodes.

Bigraphs with sharing are a generalisation of Milner's formalisation that allows for a straightforward representation of overlapping or intersecting spatial locations. In bigraphs with sharing, the place graph is defined as a directed acyclic graph (DAG), i.e. $prnt$ is a binary relation instead of a map. The definition of link graph is unaffected by the introduction of sharing. Note that standard bigraphs are a sub-class of bigraphs with sharing.

Areas of application of bigraphs with sharing include wireless networking protocols, real-time management of domestic wireless networks and mixed reality systems.

== Tools and Implementations ==
- BigraphER is a modelling and reasoning environment for bigraphs consisting of an OCaml library and a command-line tool providing an efficient implementation of rewriting, simulation and visualisation for both bigraphs and bigraphs with sharing.
- jLibBig is a Java library providing efficient and extensible implementation of bigraphical reactive systems for both bigraphs and directed bigraphs.

No longer actively developed:

- BigMC is model checker for bigraphs which includes a command line interface and visualisation.
- Big Red is a graphical editor for bigraphs with easily extensible support for various file formats.
- SBAM is a stochastic simulator for bigraphs, aimed at simulation of biological models.
- DBAM is a distributed simulator for bigraphical reactive systems.
- DBtk is a toolkit for directed bigraphs that provides calculation of IPOs, matching, and visualisation.

== See also ==
- Bisimulation
- Combinatorial species

== Bibliography ==
- Milner, Robin (2009). The Space and Motion of Communicating Agents. Cambridge University Press. ISBN 978-0-521-73833-0.
- Milner, Robin (2001). "Bigraphical reactive systems, (invited paper)". CONCUR 2001 – Concurrency Theory, Proc. 12th International Conference. Lecture Notes in Computer Science. Vol. 2154. Springer-Verlag. pp. 16–35. doi:10.1007/3-540-44685-0_2.
- Milner, Robin (2002). "Bigraphs as a Model for Mobile Interaction (invited paper)". ICGT 2002: First International Conference on Graph Transformation. Lecture Notes in Computer Science. Vol. 2505. Springer-Verlag. pp. 8–13. doi:10.1007/3-540-45832-8_3.
- Debois, Søren; Damgaard, Troels Christoffer (2005). "Bigraphs by Example". IT University Technical Report Series TR-2005-61. Denmark: IT University of Copenhagen. CiteSeerX 10.1.1.73.176. ISBN 978-87-7949-090-1.
- Sevegnani, Michele; Calder, Muffy (2015). "Bigraphs with sharing". Theoretical Computer Science. 577: 43–73. doi:10.1016/j.tcs.2015.02.011.
