= Third party liability =

Third party liability may refer to:

- Vicarious liability, a legal doctrine
- Third-party liability in insurance
