= Table Producing Language =

Table Producing Language (TPL) was an IBM mainframe program, developed by the US Bureau of Labor Statistics (BLS), for producing statistical tables. It has been superseded by the commercial product TPL Tables developed by QQQ Software.

== Overview ==
The development of TPL was initiated by BLS in the early 1970s and firstly was presented publicly at Assosisation for Computer Machinery (ACM) Annual Conference, in 1974. The language initially was designed by Richard Heddinger and Pamela Weeks under the direction of Peter Stevens, a Chief of the Division of General Systems, and curated by Rudolph C. Mendelssohn, an Assistant Commissioner.

== History ==
The TPL development started by BLS, in the early 1970s, with a study of the full range of tables. Its goals were a system able to produce most Bureau tables, driven by a language that did not require computer science training, and output fit for printing.

TPL was presented at the 1974 ACM Annual Conference. By 1975, BLS ran TPL on IBM 360/65, 370/165, and 370/168 machines under OS/MVT. For outside users (non-BLS-internal versions) TPL machines ran on the 360/50, 370/155, and 370/158. The software was distributed on tape in object code.

The system was built with the XPL compiler generator, which includes a dialect of PL/1. Within one year, the core of the system was in experimental production at BLS.

TPL version of 3.1 was tested and operated on IBM 360/65 mainframe, which enabled it to process around 2,000 variables for a single table, to handle any fixed-length formats and to have no limits on tables amount being operated.

Further TPL was adopted in other organizations. The Law Enforcement Assistance Administration (LEAA) Research Support Center integrated it into Michigan Terminal System. The Energy Information Administration used it to produce statistical tables. A 1981 article described its use for library reports. In 1982, United Nations review of survey data processing covered it.

BLS issued later versions, such Version 4.0 in 1978, and a Language Guide with a Print Control Language. TPL influenced later software - SAS PROC TABULATE was based on it. The rtables framework cites TPL as a precedent for declarative tabulation.
