= Laboratory for Foundations of Computer Science =

Academic institution in City of Edinburgh, Scotland

Coordinates: 55°55′16.5″N 3°10′25″W

The Laboratory for Foundations of Computer Science (LFCS) is a research institute within the School of Informatics at the University of Edinburgh, in Scotland. It was founded in 1987 by Rod Burstall, Robin Milner, Gordon Plotkin and Matthew Hennessy. It is a community of theoretical computer scientists with interests in concurrency, semantics, categories, algebra, types, logic, algorithms, complexity, databases and modelling.
