= SIP =

SIP or sip may refer to:

== Places ==
- Šip (Pale), Bosnia and Herzegovina
- Šip (Višegrad), Bosnia and Herzegovina
- Novi Sip, Serbia
- Simferopol International Airport (IATA: SIP), an airport in Crimea
- Suzhou Industrial Park, in Suzhou, China

== Business, finance, and economics ==
- Safety improvement plan, a plan for improving safety
- Sales incentive plan, a type of employee incentive program
- Securities information processor, the part of public infrastructure for disseminating market data in the United States
- Share Incentive Plan, a UK government approved employee plan
- Systematic investment plan, an investment strategy

== Communications and telephony ==
- Session Initiation Protocol (SIP), a communications protocol for signaling and controlling multimedia communication sessions, including voice over IP

=== Networking ===
- Service Improvement Plan, a former program to provide a defined level of basic telephone service to all Canadians
- Standard Interchange Protocol, in library systems
- System Information Packet, in the DMX512 standard for stage lighting control
- Session Initiation Protocol, a signaling protocol most commonly used in Internet Telephony

=== Software ===
- SIP (software), a tool which generates C++ interface code for the programming language Python
- Scilab Image Processing, an image processing toolbox
- Soft Input Panel, on-screen input method for devices without standard keyboards
- Submission Information Packages, in the Open Archival Information System Reference Model; see Open Archival Information System#The OAIS environment and information model
- System Integrity Protection, a security feature of macOS by Apple, starting with OS X El Capitan

=== Semiconductors ===
- Semiconductor intellectual property, a business model for licensing intellectual property
- Single in-line package, for packaging electronic components
- System in package, chip technology, also known as a chip stack multi-chip module
- Silicon photonics, silicon semiconductor used as an optical medium

== Computing ==
- Social information processing, an activity through which collective human actions organize knowledge
- Supplementary Ideographic Plane, a range of ideographic characters in the Unicode standard
- Stochastic Information Packet, an array of simulation realizations

== Engineering ==
- Second-order intercept point, a measure of linearity in amplifiers and mixers
- Shelter Implementation Plan, will help contain and manage the consequences of the Chernobyl disaster
- Signature image processing, in welding fault detection
- Sputter ion pump, a type of vacuum pump
- Standard inspection procedure, a process for checking compliance
- Sterilization-in-place, in sanitation of food preparation equipment
- Structural insulated panel, a composite building material

== Enterprises ==
- SIP Animation, originally Saban International Paris, France based TV production company
- Société genevoise d'instruments de physique, Swiss manufacturer of precision machinery
- Société Immobilière Publique, a state-owned housing company in Burundi
- Società Italiana per l'Esercizio Telefonico (originally Società Idroelettrica Piemontese), the former name of Telecom Italia
- Selznick International Pictures, a defunct film studio

== Science and mathematics ==
- Semi-infinite programming, a type of mathematical optimization problem
- Spectral induced polarisation, in geophysics
- Stable-isotope probing, used in molecular biology
- Statistically improbable phrases, a system used to find unique phrases for use as keywords
- Stochastic Information Packet, in probability management, a representation of the probability distribution of a variable
- Strongly implicit procedure, an algorithm for solving a sparse linear system of equations
- Structure-inducing probes, a peptide synthesis to stabilize long peptides

== Other uses ==
- "Sip", a song from Joeboy
- Stranka Ivana Pernara, a Croatian political party
- Shelter-in-place, an emergency procedure
- Sip (kinship)
- Sip or Zip, one of the 18 months of the Haab', a part of the Maya calendric system
- SIP Grenade, self igniting phosphorus
- The Society of International Photographers, a not-for-profit organization founded in 1936
- Soviet Interview Project, a research project conducted in the early 1980s
- Strangers in Paradise, an award-winning comic book
- State Implementation Plan, a United States state plan for complying with the federal Clean Air Act
- Sub-irrigated planter, a type of gardening container
- Sip as in SipSipStefan
- "Sip", a 2017 song by Chris Brown from Heartbreak on a Full Moon

== See also ==
- Social information processing (disambiguation)
- Stranger in Paradise (disambiguation)
