= Relation (mathematics) =

Relationship between two sets, defined by a set of ordered pairs

Illustration of an example relation on a set A = { a, b, c, d }. An arrow from x to y indicates that the relation holds between x and y. The relation is represented by the set { (a,a), (a,b), (a,d), (b,a), (b,d), (c,b), (d,c), (d,d) } of ordered pairs.

In mathematics, a relation denotes some kind of relationship between two objects in a set, which may or may not hold. As an example, "is less than" is a relation on the set of natural numbers; it holds, for instance, between the values 1 and 3 (denoted as 1 < 3), and likewise between 3 and 4 (denoted as 3 < 4), but not between the values 3 and 1 nor between 4 and 4, that is, 3 < 1 and 4 < 4 both evaluate to false. As another example, "is sister of" is a relation on the set of all people, it holds e.g. between Marie Curie and Bronisława Dłuska, and likewise vice versa. Set members may not be in relation "to a certain degree" – either they are in relation or they are not.

Formally, a relation R over a set X can be seen as a set of ordered pairs (x,y) of members of X. The relation R holds between x and y if (x,y) is a member of R. For example, the relation "is less than" on the natural numbers is an infinite set R_{less} of pairs of natural numbers that contains both (1,3) and (3,4), but neither (3,1) nor (4,4). The relation "is a nontrivial divisor of" on the set of one-digit natural numbers is sufficiently small to be shown here: R_{dv} = { (2,4), (2,6), (2,8), (3,6), (3,9), (4,8) }; for example 2 is a nontrivial divisor of 8, but not vice versa, hence (2,8) ∈ R_{dv}, but (8,2) ∉ R_{dv}.

If R is a relation that holds for x and y, one often writes xRy. For most common relations in mathematics, special symbols are introduced, like "<" for "is less than", and "|" for "is a divisor of", and, most popular "=" for "is equal to". For example, "1 < 3", "1 is less than 3", and "(1,3) ∈ R_{less}" mean all the same; some authors also write "(1,3) ∈ (<)".

Various properties of relations are investigated. A relation R is reflexive if xRx holds for all x, and irreflexive if xRx holds for no x. It is symmetric if xRy always implies yRx, and asymmetric if xRy implies that yRx is impossible. It is transitive if xRy and yRz always implies xRz. For example, "is less than" is irreflexive, asymmetric, and transitive, but neither reflexive nor symmetric. "is sister of" is neither reflexive (e.g. Pierre Curie is not a sister of himself), nor symmetric, nor asymmetric; while being irreflexive or not may be a matter of definition (is every woman a sister of herself?), (Note: If yes, then "is sister of" is also transitive.) "is ancestor of" is transitive, while "is parent of" is not. Mathematical theorems are known about combinations of relation properties, such as "a transitive relation is irreflexive if, and only if, it is asymmetric".

Of particular importance are relations that satisfy certain combinations of properties. A partial order is a relation that is reflexive, antisymmetric, and transitive, an equivalence relation is a relation that is reflexive, symmetric, and transitive, a function is a relation that is right-unique and left-total (see below).

Since relations are sets, they can be manipulated using set operations, including union, intersection, and complementation, leading to the algebra of sets. Furthermore, the calculus of relations includes the operations of taking the converse and composing relations.

The above concept of relation (Note: called "homogeneous binary relation (on sets)" when delineation from its generalizations is important) has been generalized to admit relations between members of two different sets (heterogeneous relation, like "lies on" between the set of all points and that of all lines in geometry), relations between three or more sets (finitary relation, like "person x lives in town y at time z"), and relations between classes (Note: a generalization of sets) (like "is an element of" on the class of all sets, see Binary relation § Sets versus classes).

== Definition ==
Given a set X, a relation R over X is a set of ordered pairs of elements from X, formally: R ⊆ { (x,y) | x, y ∈ X }.

The statement (x,y) ∈ R reads "x is R-related to y" and is written in infix notation as xRy. The order of the elements is important; if x ≠ y then yRx can be true or false independently of xRy. For example, 3 divides 9, but 9 does not divide 3.

== Representation of relations ==
The representation of the relation R_{el} = { (x,y) ∈ R × R | x^{2} + xy + y^{2} = 1 } as a 2D-plot yields an ellipse.

y x	1	2	3	4	6	12
1	Yes	Yes	Yes	Yes	Yes	Yes
2	No	Yes	No	Yes	Yes	Yes
3	No	No	Yes	No	Yes	Yes
4	No	No	No	Yes	No	Yes
6	No	No	No	No	Yes	Yes
12	No	No	No	No	No	Yes
Representation of R_{div} as a Boolean matrix

Representation R_{div} as Hasse diagram (black lines) and directed graph (all lines)

A relation R on a finite set X may be represented as:

- Directed graph: Each member of X corresponds to a vertex; a directed edge from x to y exists if and only if (x,y) ∈ R.
- Boolean matrix: The members of X are arranged in some fixed sequence x_{1}, ..., x_{n}; the matrix has dimensions n × n, with the element in line i, column j, being, if (x_{i},x_{j}) ∈ R, and, otherwise.
- 2D-plot: As a generalization of a Boolean matrix, a relation on the –infinite– set R of real numbers can be represented as a two-dimensional geometric figure: using Cartesian coordinates, draw a point at (x,y) whenever (x,y) ∈ R.

A transitive (Note: see below) relation R on a finite set X may be also represented as

- Hasse diagram: Each member of X corresponds to a vertex; directed edges are drawn such that a directed path from x to y exists if and only if (x,y) ∈ R. Compared to a directed-graph representation, a Hasse diagram needs fewer edges, leading to a less tangled image. Since the relation "a directed path exists from x to y" is transitive, only transitive relations can be represented in Hasse diagrams. Usually the diagram is laid out such that all edges point in an upward direction, and the arrows are omitted.

For example, on the set of all divisors of 12, define the relation R_{div} by

x R_{div} y if x is a divisor of y and x ≠ y.

Formally, X = { 1, 2, 3, 4, 6, 12 } and R_{div} = { (1,2), (1,3), (1,4), (1,6), (1,12), (2,4), (2,6), (2,12), (3,6), (3,12), (4,12), (6,12) }. The representation of R_{div} as a Boolean matrix is shown in the middle table; the representation both as a Hasse diagram and as a directed graph is shown in the left picture.

The following are equivalent:

- x R_{div} y is true.
- (x,y) ∈ R_{div}.
- A path from x to y exists in the Hasse diagram representing R_{div}.
- An edge from x to y exists in the directed graph representing R_{div}.
- In the Boolean matrix representing R_{div}, the element in line x, column y is "".

As another example, define the relation R_{el} on R by

x R_{el} y if x^{2} + xy + y^{2} = 1.

The representation of R_{el} as a 2D-plot obtains an ellipse, see right picture. Since R is not finite, neither a directed graph, nor a finite Boolean matrix, nor a Hasse diagram can be used to depict R_{el}.

== Properties of relations ==
Some important properties that a relation R over a set X may have are:

Reflexive
for all x ∈ X, xRx. For example, ≥ is a reflexive relation but > is not.

Irreflexive (or strict)
for all x ∈ X, not xRx. For example, > is an irreflexive relation, but ≥ is not.

The previous 2 alternatives are not exhaustive; e.g., the red relation y = x^{2} given in the diagram below is neither irreflexive, nor reflexive, since it contains the pair (0,0), but not (2,2), respectively.

Symmetric
for all x, y ∈ X, if xRy then yRx. For example, "is a blood relative of" is a symmetric relation, because x is a blood relative of y if and only if y is a blood relative of x.

Antisymmetric
for all x, y ∈ X, if xRy and yRx then x = y. For example, ≥ is an antisymmetric relation; so is >, but vacuously (the condition in the definition is always false).

Asymmetric
for all x, y ∈ X, if xRy then not yRx. A relation is asymmetric if and only if it is both antisymmetric and irreflexive. For example, > is an asymmetric relation, but ≥ is not.

Again, the previous 3 alternatives are far from being exhaustive; as an example over the natural numbers, the relation xRy defined by x > 2 is neither symmetric (e.g. 5R1, but not 1R5) nor antisymmetric (e.g. 6R4, but also 4R6), let alone asymmetric.

Transitive
for all x, y, z ∈ X, if xRy and yRz then xRz. A transitive relation is irreflexive if and only if it is asymmetric. For example, "is ancestor of" is a transitive relation, while "is parent of" is not.

Connected
for all x, y ∈ X, if x ≠ y then xRy or yRx. For example, on the natural numbers, < is connected, while "is a divisor of" is not (e.g. neither 5R7 nor 7R5).

Strongly connected
for all x, y ∈ X, xRy or yRx. For example, on the natural numbers, ≤ is strongly connected, but < is not. A relation is strongly connected if, and only if, it is connected and reflexive.

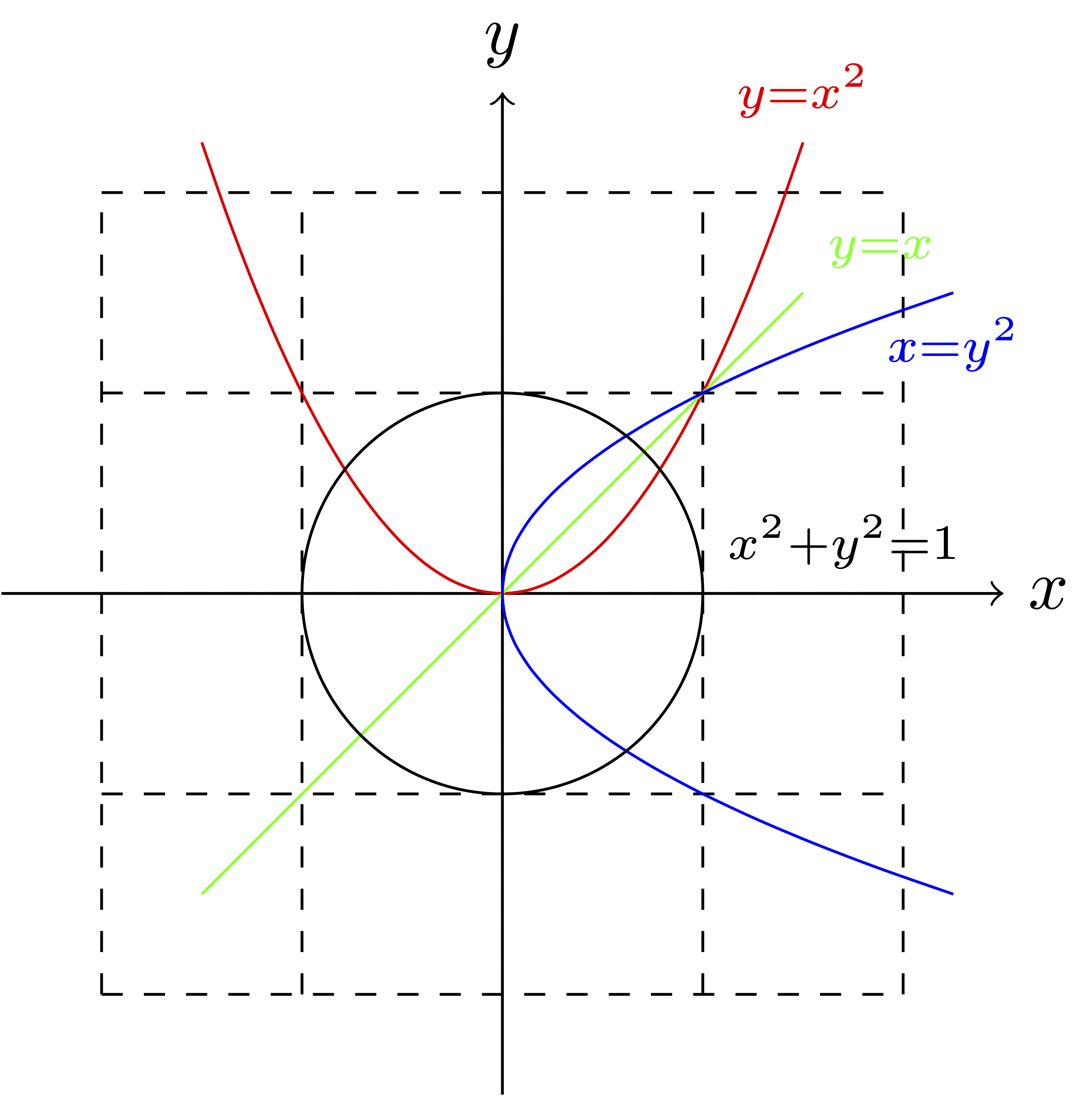
Examples of four types of relations over the real numbers: one-to-one (in green), one-to-many (in blue), many-to-one (in red), many-to-many (in black). 2D-plot representation is used.

=== Uniqueness properties ===
Injective (Note: These properties also generalize to heterogeneous relations.) (also called left-unique)
For all x, y, z ∈ X, if xRy and zRy then x = z. For example, the green and blue relations in the diagram are injective, but the red one is not (as it relates both −1 and 1 to 1), nor is the black one (as it relates both −1 and 1 to 0).
Functional (also called right-unique, right-definite or univalent)
For all x, y, z ∈ X, if xRy and xRz then y = z. Such a relation is called a partial function. For example, the red and green relations in the diagram are functional, but the blue one is not (as it relates 1 to both −1 and 1), nor is the black one (as it relates 0 to both −1 and 1).

=== Totality properties ===
Serial (also called total or left-total)
For all x ∈ X, there exists some y ∈ X such that xRy. For example, the red and green relations in the diagram are total, but the blue one is not (as it does not relate −1 to any real number), nor is the black one (as it does not relate 2 to any real number). As another example, > is a serial relation over the integers. But it is not a serial relation over the positive integers, because there is no y in the positive integers such that 1 > y. However, < is a serial relation over the positive integers, the rational numbers and the real numbers. Every reflexive relation is serial: for a given x, choose y = x.

Surjective (also called right-total or onto)
For all y ∈ X, there exists an x ∈ X such that xRy. For example, the green and blue relations in the diagram are surjective, but the red one is not (as it does not relate any real number to −1), nor is the black one (as it does not relate any real number to 2).

=== Combinations of properties ===
Relations by property
	Reflexivity	Symmetry	Transitivity	Connectedness	Example
Partial order	Refl	Antisym	Yes		Subset
Strict partial order	Irrefl	Asym	Yes		Strict subset
Total order	Refl	Antisym	Yes	Yes	Alphabetical order
Strict total order	Irrefl	Asym	Yes	Yes	Strict alphabetical order
Equivalence relation	Refl	Sym	Yes		Equality

Relations that satisfy certain combinations of the above properties are particularly useful, and thus have received names by their own.

Equivalence relation
A relation that is reflexive, symmetric, and transitive. It is also a relation that is symmetric, transitive, and serial, since these properties imply reflexivity.

==== Orderings ====
Partial order
A relation that is reflexive, antisymmetric, and transitive.

Strict partial order
A relation that is irreflexive, asymmetric, and transitive.

Total order
A relation that is reflexive, antisymmetric, transitive and connected.

Strict total order
A relation that is irreflexive, asymmetric, transitive and connected.

==== Uniqueness properties ====
One-to-one
Injective and functional. For example, the green relation in the diagram is one-to-one, but the red, blue and black ones are not.
One-to-many
Injective and not functional. For example, the blue relation in the diagram is one-to-many, but the red, green and black ones are not.
Many-to-one
Functional and not injective. For example, the red relation in the diagram is many-to-one, but the green, blue and black ones are not.
Many-to-many
Not injective nor functional. For example, the black relation in the diagram is many-to-many, but the red, green and blue ones are not.

==== Uniqueness and totality properties ====
A function
A relation that is functional and total. For example, the red and green relations in the diagram are functions, but the blue and black ones are not.
An injection
A function that is injective. For example, the green relation in the diagram is an injection, but the red, blue and black ones are not.
A surjection
A function that is surjective. For example, the green relation in the diagram is a surjection, but the red, blue and black ones are not.
A bijection
A function that is injective and surjective. For example, the green relation in the diagram is a bijection, but the red, blue and black ones are not.

== Operations on relations ==
Union (Note: This operation also generalizes to heterogeneous relations.)
If R and S are relations over X then R ∪ S = { (x, y) | xRy or xSy } is the union relation of R and S. The identity element of this operation is the empty relation. For example, ≤ is the union of < and =, and ≥ is the union of > and =.

Intersection
If R and S are relations over X then R ∩ S = { (x, y) | xRy and xSy } is the intersection relation of R and S. The identity element of this operation is the universal relation. For example, "is a lower card of the same suit as" is the intersection of "is a lower card than" and "belongs to the same suit as".

Composition
If R and S are relations over X then S ∘ R = { (x, z) | there exists y ∈ X such that xRy and ySz } (also denoted by R; S) is the relative product of R and S. The identity element is the identity relation. The order of R and S in the notation S ∘ R, used here agrees with the standard notational order for composition of functions. For example, the composition "is mother of" ∘ "is parent of" yields "is maternal grandparent of", while the composition "is parent of" ∘ "is mother of" yields "is grandmother of". For the former case, if x is the parent of y and y is the mother of z, then x is the maternal grandparent of z.

Converse
If R is a relation over sets X and Y then R^{T} = { (y, x) | xRy } is the converse relation of R over Y and X. For example, = is the converse of itself, as is ≠, and < and > are each other's converse, as are ≤ and ≥.

Complement
If R is a relation over X then R̅ = { (x, y) | x, y ∈ X and not xRy } (also denoted by ~~R~~ or ¬R) is the complementary relation of R. For example, = and ≠ are each other's complement, as are ⊆ and ⊈, ⊇ and ⊉, and ∈ and ∉, and, for total orders, also < and ≥, and > and ≤. The complement of the converse relation R^{T} is the converse of the complement: $\overline{R^\mathsf{T}} = \bar{R}^\mathsf{T}.$

Restriction
If R is a relation over X and S is a subset of X then R_{|S} = { (x, y) | xRy and x, y ∈ S } is the restriction relation of R to S. The expression R_{|S} = { (x, y) | xRy and x ∈ S } is the left-restriction relation of R to S; the expression R^{|S} = { (x, y) | xRy and y ∈ S } is called the right-restriction relation of R to S. If a relation is reflexive, irreflexive, symmetric, antisymmetric, asymmetric, transitive, total, trichotomous, a partial order, total order, strict weak order, total preorder (weak order), or an equivalence relation, then so too are its restrictions. However, the transitive closure of a restriction is a subset of the restriction of the transitive closure, i.e., in general not equal. For example, restricting the relation "x is parent of y" to women yields the relation "x is mother of the woman y"; its transitive closure does not relate a woman with her paternal grandmother. On the other hand, the transitive closure of "is parent of" is "is ancestor of"; its restriction to women does relate a woman with her paternal grandmother.

A relation R over sets X and Y is said to be contained in a relation S over X and Y, written R ⊆ S, if R is a subset of S, that is, for all x ∈ X and y ∈ Y, if xRy, then xSy. If R is contained in S and S is contained in R, then R and S are called equal written R = S. If R is contained in S but S is not contained in R, then R is said to be smaller than S, written R ⊊ S. For example, on the rational numbers, the relation > is smaller than ≥, and equal to the composition > ∘ >.

== Theorems about relations ==
- A relation is asymmetric if, and only if, it is antisymmetric and irreflexive.
- A transitive relation is irreflexive if, and only if, it is asymmetric.
- A relation is reflexive if, and only if, its complement is irreflexive.
- A relation is strongly connected if, and only if, it is connected and reflexive.
- A relation is equal to its converse if, and only if, it is symmetric.
- A relation is connected if, and only if, its complement is anti-symmetric.
- A relation is strongly connected if, and only if, its complement is asymmetric.
- If R and S are relations over a set X, and R is contained in S, then
  - If R is reflexive, connected, strongly connected, left-total, or right-total, then so is S.
  - If S is irreflexive, asymmetric, anti-symmetric, left-unique, or right-unique, then so is R.
- A relation is reflexive, irreflexive, symmetric, asymmetric, anti-symmetric, connected, strongly connected, and transitive if its converse is, respectively.

== Examples ==
- Order relations, including strict orders:
  - Greater than
  - Greater than or equal to
  - Less than
  - Less than or equal to
  - Divides (evenly)
  - Subset of
- Equivalence relations:
  - Equality
  - Parallel with (for affine spaces)
  - Is in bijection with
  - Isomorphic
- Tolerance relation, a reflexive and symmetric relation:
  - Dependency relation, a finite tolerance relation
  - Independency relation, the complement of some dependency relation
- Kinship relations

== Generalizations ==
The above concept of relation has been generalized to admit relations between members of two different sets. Given sets X and Y, a heterogeneous relation R over X and Y is a subset of { (x,y) | x∈X, y∈Y }. When X = Y, the relation concept described above is obtained; it is often called homogeneous relation (or endorelation) to distinguish it from its generalization. The above properties and operations that are marked "" and "", respectively, generalize to heterogeneous relations. An example of a heterogeneous relation is "ocean x borders continent y". The best-known examples are functions (Note: that is, right-unique and left-total heterogeneous relations) with distinct domains and ranges, such as sqrt : N → R_{+}.

== See also ==
- Incidence structure, a heterogeneous relation between set of points and lines
- Order theory, investigates properties of order relations
- Relation algebra

== Bibliography ==
- Best, Eike (1996). Semantics of Sequential and Parallel Programs. Prentice Hall. ISBN 978-0-13-460643-9.
- Codd, Edgar Frank (June 1970). "A Relational Model of Data for Large Shared Data Banks" (PDF). Communications of the ACM. 13 (6): 377–387. doi:10.1145/362384.362685. S2CID 207549016.
- Codd, Edgar Frank (1990). The Relational Model for Database Management: Version 2. Boston: Addison-Wesley. ISBN 978-0201141924.
- Enderton, Herbert (1977). Elements of Set Theory. Boston: Academic Press. ISBN 978-0-12-238440-0.
- Flaška, V.; Ježek, J.; Kepka, T.; Kortelainen, J. (2007). Transitive Closures of Binary Relations I (PDF). Prague: School of Mathematics – Physics Charles University. Archived from the original (PDF) on 2013-11-02.
- Halmos, Paul R. (1968). Naive Set Theory. Princeton: Nostrand.
- Kilp, Mati; Knauer, Ulrich; Mikhalev, Alexander (2000). Monoids, Acts and Categories: with Applications to Wreath Products and Graphs. Berlin: De Gruyter. ISBN 978-3-11-015248-7.
- Mäs, Stephan (2007), "Reasoning on Spatial Semantic Integrity Constraints", Spatial Information Theory: 8th International Conference, COSIT 2007, Melbourne, Australia, September 19–23, Proceedings, Lecture Notes in Computer Science, vol. 4736, Springer, pp. 285–302, doi:10.1007/978-3-540-74788-8_18, ISBN 978-3-540-74786-4
- Müller, M. E. (2012). Relational Knowledge Discovery. Cambridge University Press. ISBN 978-0-521-19021-3.
- Nievergelt, Yves (2002), Foundations of Logic and Mathematics: Applications to Computer Science and Cryptography, Springer-Verlag
- Pahl, Peter J.; Damrath, Rudolf (2001). Mathematical Foundations of Computational Engineering: A Handbook. Springer Science & Business Media. ISBN 978-3-540-67995-0.
- Peirce, Charles Sanders (1873). "Description of a Notation for the Logic of Relatives, Resulting from an Amplification of the Conceptions of Boole's Calculus of Logic". Memoirs of the American Academy of Arts and Sciences. 9 (2): 317–178. Bibcode:1873MAAAS...9..317P. doi:10.2307/25058006. hdl:2027/hvd.32044019561034. JSTOR 25058006.
- Riemann, Robert-Christoph (1999). Modelling of Concurrent Systems: Structural and Semantical Methods in the High Level Petri Net Calculus. Herbert Utz Verlag. ISBN 978-3-89675-629-9.
- Rosenstein, Joseph G. (1982), Linear orderings, Academic Press, ISBN 0-12-597680-1
- Schmidt, Gunther (2010). Relational Mathematics. Cambridge: Cambridge University Press. ISBN 978-0-521-76268-7.
- Schmidt, Gunther; Ströhlein, Thomas (1993). Relations and Graphs: Discrete Mathematics for Computer Scientists. Berlin: Springer. ISBN 978-3-642-77970-1.
- Smith, Douglas; Eggen, Maurice; St. Andre, Richard (2006), A Transition to Advanced Mathematics (6th ed.), Brooks/Cole, ISBN 0-534-39900-2
- Van Gasteren, Antonetta (1990). On the Shape of Mathematical Arguments. Berlin: Springer. ISBN 9783540528494.
- Yao, Y.Y.; Wong, S.K.M. (1995). "Generalization of rough sets using relationships between attribute values" (PDF). Proceedings of the 2nd Annual Joint Conference on Information Sciences: 30–33.
