= Šip =

Šip may refer to:

- Šip (Pale), Bosnia and Herzegovina
- Šip (Višegrad), Bosnia and Herzegovina

== See also ==
- SIP (disambiguation)
