= XIP (disambiguation) =

XIP or Xip may refer to:

== Computing ==
- Execute in place (XIP), in computing
- .XIP file extension for XAR files
- Xerox Incremental Parser (XIP), from Rank Xerox

== Other uses ==
- Shipibo language (ISO 639 language code xip), a South American language
- Xiping County (geocode XIP; Chinese: 西平县, romanized: Xīpíng-Xiàn), Zhumadian, Henan, China; see List of administrative divisions of Henan
- unclassified X intrinsic proteins (XIPs), major intrinsic proteins
- XIP, a catalogue prefix used by Saga Records

== See also ==
- Xenon Ion Propulsion System (XIPS), spacecraft thruster
- 11P (disambiguation)
- Chip (disambiguation)
- Ship (disambiguation)
- SIP (disambiguation)
- ZIP (disambiguation)
