= DEP =

DEP or Dep may refer to:

== Arts, entertainment, and media ==
- Dep (magazine), a publication of Vietnam News Agency
- DēP, American singer
- DEP International, a defunct British record label founded by the band UB40
- Dillinger Escape Plan, an American mathcore band

== Organizations ==
- Delayed Entry Program, a United States Armed Forces recruit program
- Democracy Party (Turkey), pro-Kurdish political party in Turkey
- Department of Environmental Protection (disambiguation), a common government agency

== Places ==
- Dep (city), Ancient Egyptian city that merged into Buto
- Dep (river), a river in Amur Oblast, Russia
- Dep, Iran
- Deptford railway station, London, England, National Rail station code

== Science and technology ==
- Data Execution Prevention, a security feature in computer operating systems
- Dielectrophoresis, the force exerted on a dielectric particle subjected to a non-uniform electric field
- Diethyl phthalate, an organic compound
- Diethylphosphite, an organophosphorus compound

== Other uses ==
- Dépanneur, Quebec English term for a convenience store
- Dependency (disambiguation), including dependence, dependent, and depend
- Shorthand for depot
