= Sippy =

Sippy can refer to the following:

== People ==
- G. P. Sippy (1914-2007), Indian film producer
  - Ramesh Sippy (born 1947), Indian film director, son of G.P.
  - Rohan Sippy, Indian film director and producer, son of Ramesh
- N. C. Sippy (1926-2001), Indian film producer and director
  - Raj N. Sippy (born 1948), Indian film director and producer, son of N. C.
- Rajan Sippy, Indian film actor, producer and businessman
- Sippy Grewal, Indian film producer
- Sippy Pallippuram, Indian children's story writer
- Cynthia Woodhead (born 1964), nicknamed "Sippy", American swimmer

== See also ==
- Sippy cup
- Sippy Downs, Queensland
- Sippy Nagar, Karnataka, India
- SIP (disambiguation)
