= Interview (journalism) =

Series of questions and answers led by a journalist

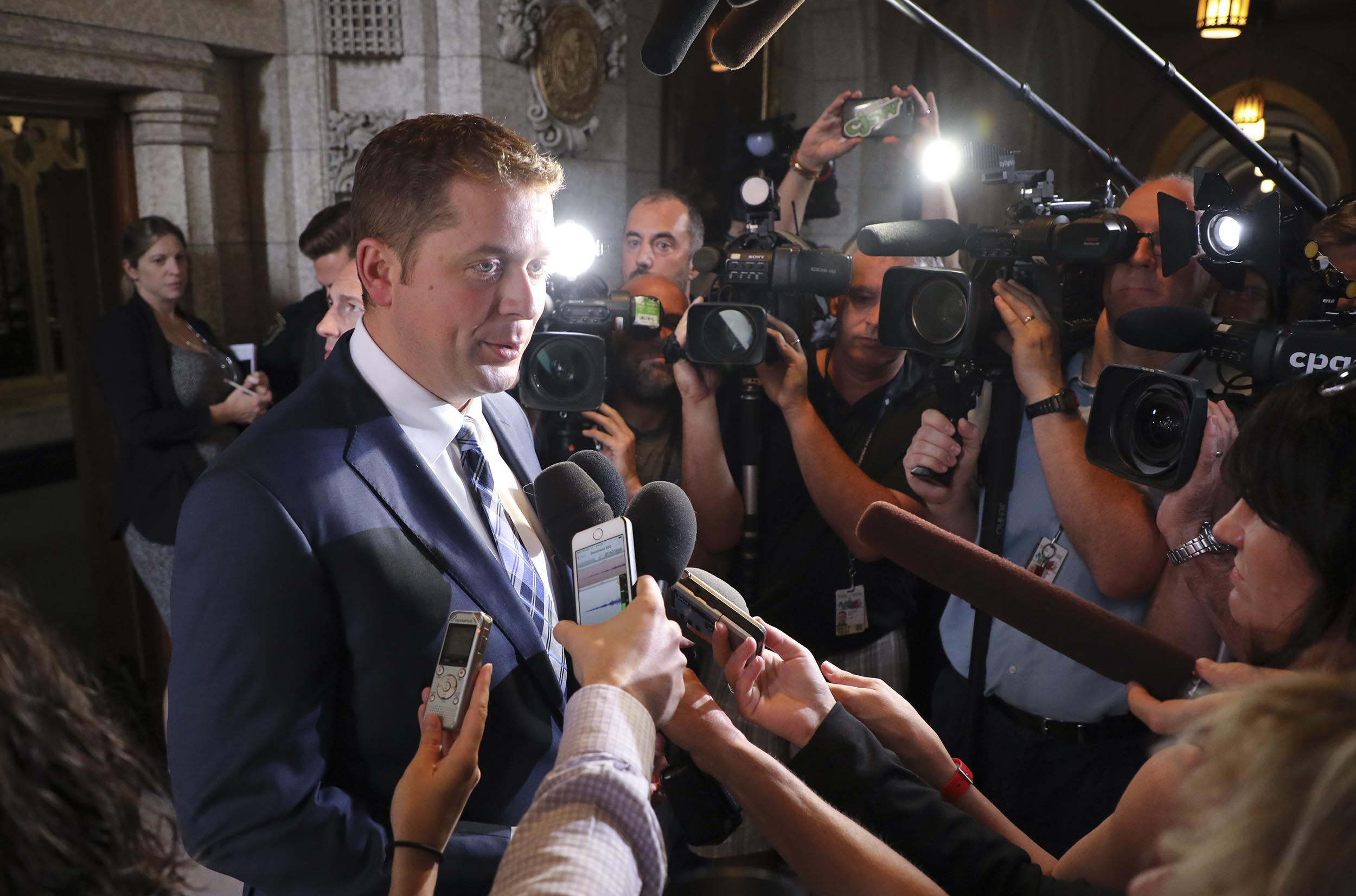
Canadian politician Andrew Scheer being interviewed in a scrum

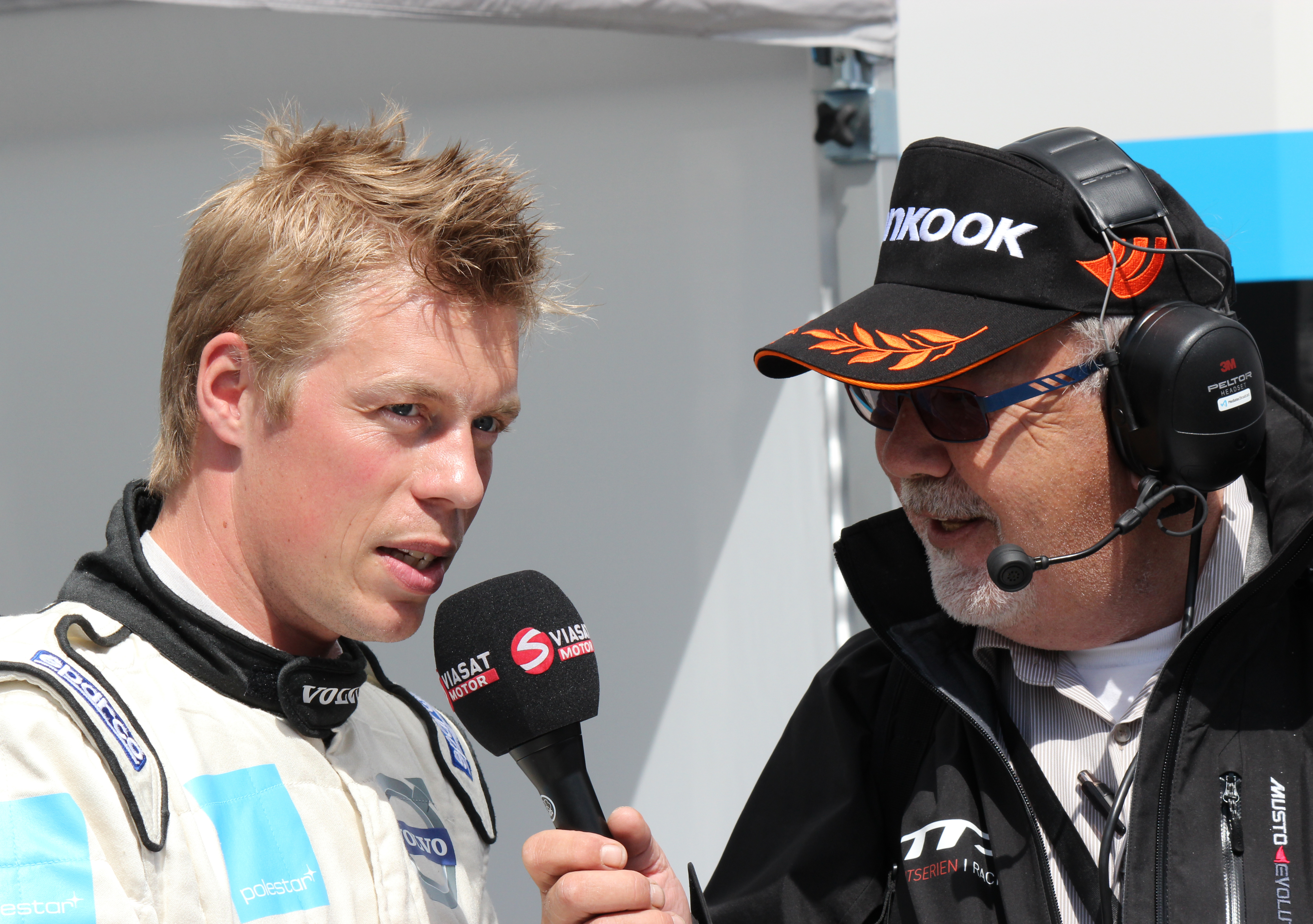
An interview with Thed Björk, a Swedish racing driver.

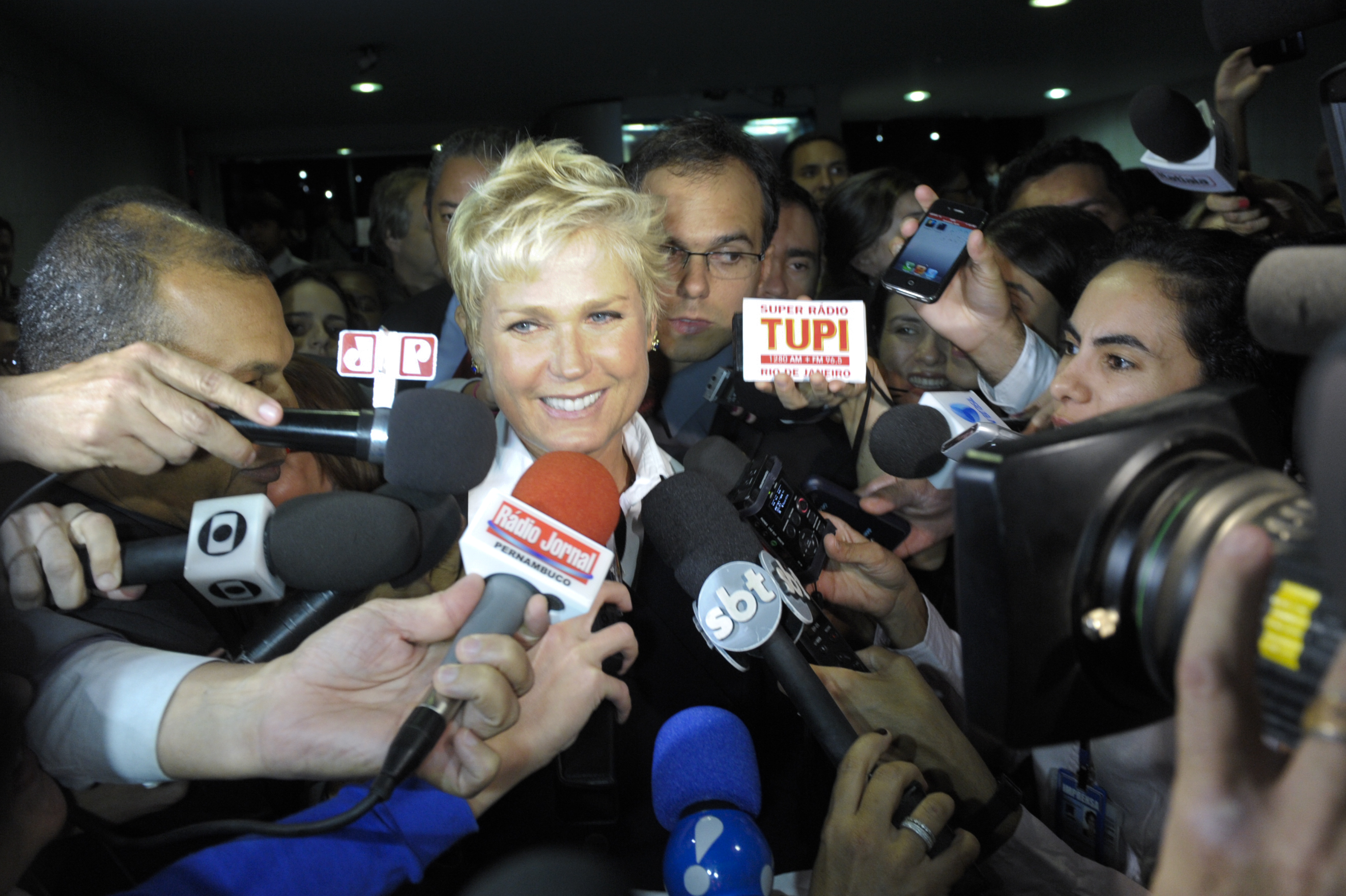
Xuxa, Brazilian television presenter, during an interview.

A journalistic interview takes the form of a conversation between two or more people: interviewer(s) ask questions to elicit facts or statements from interviewee(s). Interviews are a standard part of journalism and media reporting. In journalism, interviews are one of the most important methods used to collect information, and present views to readers, listeners, or viewers.

== History ==
Although the question-and-answer interview in journalism dates back to the 1850s, the first known interview that fits the matrix of interview-as-genre has been claimed to be the 1756 interview by Archbishop Timothy Gabashvili (1704–1764), prominent Georgian religious figure, diplomat, writer and traveler, who was interviewing Eugenios Voulgaris (1716–1806), renowned Greek theologian, Rector of Orthodox School of Mount Athos.

== Publications ==
Several publications give prominence to interviews, including:

- Interviews with novelists conducted since 1940 by The Paris Review
- Interviews with celebrities conducted by Interview magazine, co-founded by Andy Warhol in 1969
- The Rolling Stone Interview, featured in Rolling Stone magazine

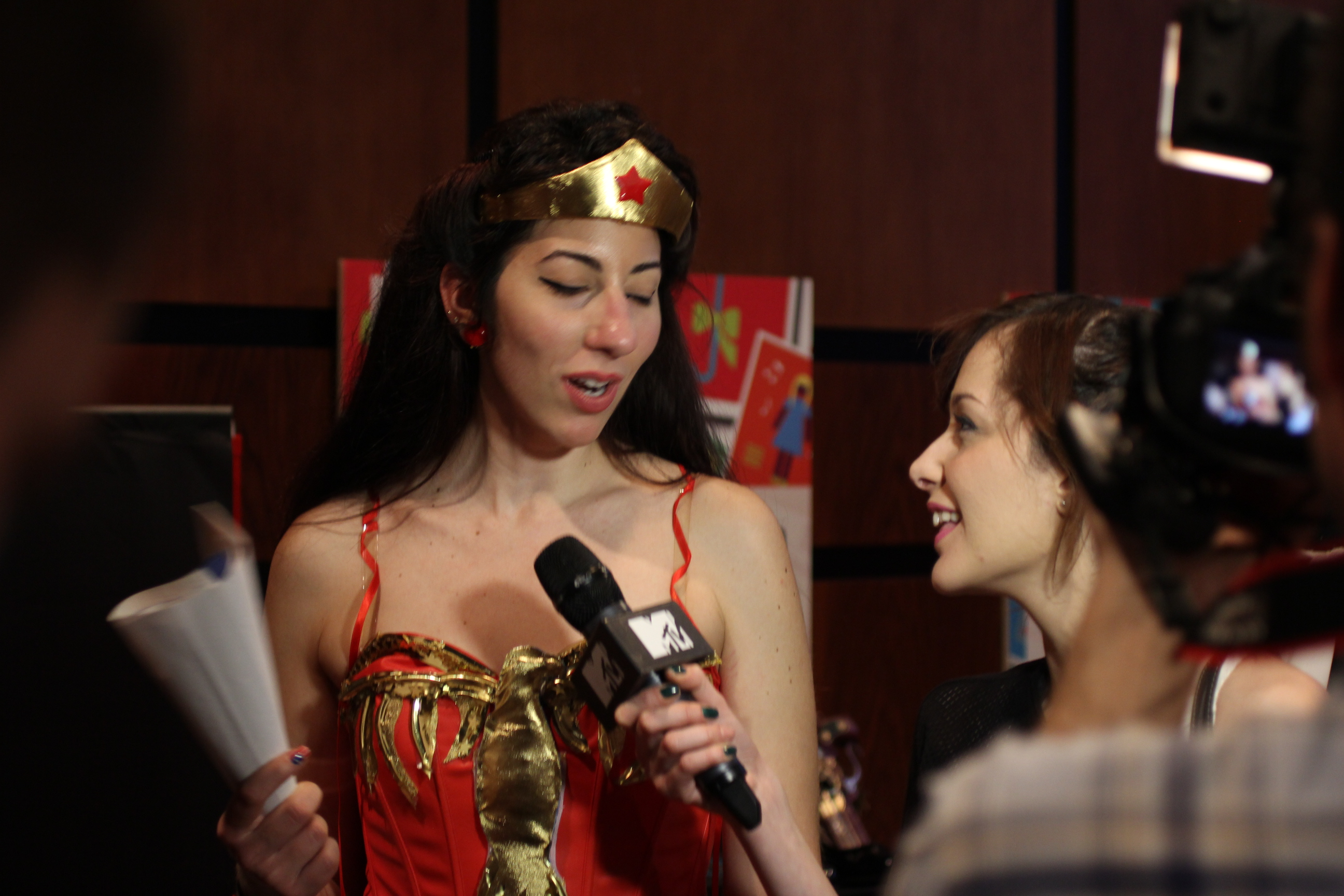
Journalists interviewing a cosplayer

== Famous interviews ==
- 1957–1960: The Mike Wallace Interview – 30-minute television program interviews conducted by Mike Wallace
- 1968: Interviews with Phil Ochs – an interview of folk singer Phil Ochs conducted by Broadside Magazine
- 1974: Michael Parkinson/Muhammad Ali – television interview of Ali in his prime
- 1977: The Nixon Interviews – 1977 television interviews by British journalist David Frost of former United States President Richard Nixon
- early 1980s: Soviet Interview Project – conducted with Soviet emigrants to the United States
- 1992: Fellini: I'm a Born Liar – Federico Fellini's last filmed interviews conducted in 1992 for a 2002 feature documentary
- 1992: Nevermind It's an Interview – interviews with the band Nirvana recorded in 1992 on the night they appeared on Saturday Night Live
- 1993: Michael Jackson talks to Oprah Winfrey. This became the fourth most watched event in American television history as well as the most watched interview ever, with an audience of one hundred million.
- 1993: Birthday cake interview – an interview of Dr. John Hewson that contributed to the defeat of his party in the 1993 Australian federal election
- 2002–2003: Living with Michael Jackson – a 2002–2003 interview with Michael Jackson, later turned into a documentary
- 2003: February 2003 Saddam Hussein interview – Dan Rather interviewing Saddam Hussein days before the 2003 invasion of Iraq
- 2008: Sarah Palin interviews with Katie Couric – Katie Couric interviewing Sarah Palin
- 2024: Tucker Carlson interviews Russian President Vladimir Putin

== See also ==
- Investigative interview
