= Dependency =

Dependency, dependence, dependent or depend may refer to:

== Computer science ==
- Dependency (computer science) or coupling, a state in which one object uses a function of another object
- Data dependency, which describes a dependence relation between statements in a program
- Dependence analysis, in compiler theory
- Dependency (UML), a relationship between one element in the Unified Modeling Language
- Dependency relation, a type of binary relation in mathematics and computer science.
- Functional dependency, a relationship between database attributes allowing normalization.
- Dependent type, in computer science and logic, a type that depends on a value
- Hidden dependency, a relation in which a change in many areas of a program produces unexpected side-effects
- Library dependency, a relationship described in and managed by a software dependency manager tool to mitigate dependency hell

== Economics ==
- Dependant (British English) (Dependent - American English), a person who depends on another as a primary source of income
- Dependency ratio, in economics, the ratio of the economically dependent part of the economy to the productive part
- Dependency theory, an economic worldview that posits that resources flow from poor states to wealthy states

== Linguistics ==
- Dependent and independent verb forms, distinct verb forms in Goidelic languages used with or without a preceding particle
- Dependency grammar is based on the dependency relation between the lexemes of a sentence
- Dependent clause

== Mathematics ==
- Dependency relation, a type of binary relation in mathematics and computer science.
- Dependent and independent variables, in mathematics, the variable that depends on the independent variable
- Dependence (probability theory), when the occurrence of one event affects the likelihood of another
  - Tail dependence, from probability theory
  - Serial dependence, in statistics
  - Correlation and dependence
  - Mean dependence

== Medicine and psychology ==
- Codependence, a pattern of detrimental behavioral interactions within a dysfunctional relationship
- Dependency need, the real need of the organism, or something that individuals cannot provide for themselves
- Dependent personality disorder, a personality disorder characterized by a pervasive psychological dependence on other people
- Substance dependence, an adaptive state associated with a withdrawal syndrome upon cessation of repeated exposure to a stimulus (e.g., drug intake)
  - Physical dependence, dependence that involves persistent physical–somatic withdrawal symptoms (e.g., fatigue and delirium tremens)
  - Psychological dependence, dependence that involves emotional–motivational withdrawal symptoms (e.g., dysphoria and anhedonia)
  - Alcohol dependence
  - Amphetamine dependence
  - Barbiturate dependence
  - Benzodiazepine dependence
  - Caffeine dependence
  - Cannabis dependence
  - Cocaine dependence
  - Opioid dependence
  - Tanning dependence

== Political science ==
- Dependent territory, a classification of territory, especially a region that is not a sovereign state but a possession of same
  - Crown Dependencies, three specific dependencies of the United Kingdom: the Bailiwick of Guernsey, the Bailiwick of Jersey, and the Isle of Man
  - Dependencies of Norway
  - Ross Dependency, New Zealand Antarctic claim

== Music ==
- Dependent (record label), a German independent record label that focuses on aggrotech, electro-industrial and futurepop music
- Dependent Music, an independent Canadian record label, owned and operated by the artists that were a part of the collective
- Dependency (band), an American Christian hardcore band

== Philosophy ==
- Dependent (origination), in Buddhism, the idea that the existence of everything is conditional and dependent on a cause, and that nothing happens fortuitously or by chance

== Other uses ==
- Depend (undergarment), a brand of absorbent, disposable underwear for adults
- Dependency (project management), a link amongst a project's terminal elements
- Dependency (religion), the relation of a monastic community with a newer community
