= Moral support =

Way of giving support to a person or cause

Moral support is a way of giving support to a person or cause, or to one side in a conflict, without making any contribution beyond the emotional or psychological value of the encouragement by supporting them.

For example, in a war between two countries or alliances, a third nation may give moral support to one side, without actually participating in the conflict (for example, Paraguay in World War II).

Another common example can be found in sports. By coming out to watch one's friend's team play a match, one is likely not directly supporting their team in any significant way, but one's friend may still feel encouraged by the moral support of one's presence.

The line between moral support and other forms of help is often hard to draw. For example, some athletes report that they play better when the spectators encourage them—and in some cases referees' decisions may be influenced by a partisan crowd.

There is also moral support that one can offer someone who is experiencing a difficult situation. One may not be able to offer any concrete assistance except empathy.

There are several key terms relating to the premise of moral support. One is the term "moral", which is defined as partaking in actions considered ethical or proper, and being the distinction between "right" and "wrong" (APA Dictionary). Humans are all "morally motivated" and guided by a moral code, which is defined as the ethical values or principles that people use to guide their behaviour (APA Dictionary). An individual's morals and moral code are influenced by culture (Haidt 2007). Morality itself is said to be universal among humans (Haidt 2007).

"Moral support" is a term commonly used in popular culture. There is no formal definition of the term "moral support" in the psychological literature, nor is there a formalised or operationalised way to measure it. Whilst there is not much in the literature explicitly examining the topic of moral support as a subject, a lot of the literature contains discussions of topics closely related to moral support. These topics, themes and definitions, although not named as such, would amount to a direct acknowledgment of the existence of moral support.

== Theoretical basis ==
The morals a person has as an adult come as a direct product of their moral development. Literature surrounding this field of study occasionally refers to moral support in the context of parents aiding their children in making moral decisions (Turiel 1983). From an early age, humans are able to intuitively identify a morally charged situation from a more mundane one, as explained by Social Domain Theory (Turiel 1983). These ‘unique’ moral situations may require a different kind of approach or even assistance in order to be dealt with; this is when moral support can be required.

Humans are highly social. Our cultures demand conformity (Asch 1951) to certain societal norms, such as conforming to moral codes and pressures. When deciding between the "wrong" or "right" decisions, a person may need emotional support, or approval from another peer in the form of moral support.

Moral support can come in the form of influence by norms and role models (Aquino and Freeman). A person's surrounding environment can influence the extent to which the decisions they make are "moral". This depends on the person's moral identity, and whether or not they consider being a moral person as an important part of their identity. In an environment where the expression of moral identities, constructs and concerns is common and overt, people that value morals highly within their identity experience reinforcement of their own moral identity. Individuals that would ordinarily assign low importance to their morals, may experience a "temporary moral identity" which will influence the way in which they make a moral decision. Those with high importance moral identities gained moral support from this environment, which is why they experience this reinforcement of identity. Those with low importance moral identities experience this temporary moral identity, because their environment provides them with moral support and insight when making a morally charged decision, leading to more moral behaviour.

Furthermore, the Social Information Processing (Crick and Dodge, 1994) in conjunction with Moral Decision-Making Framework (Garrigan, Adlam, Langdon 2018) shows how in a morally charged situation, a proximal decision is made by following a set of internalised cues, before a behaviour in enacted. The framework shows how these internal cues take into consideration social factors, most notably peer interaction, parenting and culture. This supports the idea that we look, even if subconsciously, to others for moral support when making moral decisions.

See also Moral Psychology and Moral Behaviour

== Applications of moral support ==
=== In purchase decisions ===
The role of moral support has also been identified as a key player in consumer behaviour (Lowe and Haws 2014). This research explicitly relates self-control to moral behaviour. The study examines identical purchasing decisions made by two different people. An example of buying some food for consumption is used. If the two people both decided to buy the food this is known as "co-indulgence"; if the two people both decide to abstain from making the purchase this is known as "co-abstinence". In a third situation, one person decides to purchase the food, while the other does not.

Guilt is an important underlying element in this study. The purchasing decisions are described as being "self-control" decisions. If the decision to buy the food prevents progress of a goal, for example maintaining a healthy diet, and the person chooses to make the purchase regardless of this, then the feeling of guilt will taint the overall experience and enjoyment of the purchase. In the case of the third example, when one party indulged and the other abstained, the person who made the purchase displayed more feelings of guilt and enjoyed the purchase least out of all the scenarios. If both parties however made the 'wrong' decision together in purchasing the item, much less guilt was displayed.

Consumers often use guilt management strategie to permit contradictory behaviour (Gregory-Smtih, Smith, Winklhofer 2013). Peer compliance reduces guilt, and this manifests itself as moral support. The guilt is felt when the person feels they have substantially ruptured their morals, by doing the "wrong" thing and making the purchase. However, if both persons make the indulgent purchase, the feelings of guilt are greatly lessened and enjoyment is bolstered because there is a feeling of solidarity in this "wrong" choice. Similarly, if both consumers chose to abstain and do the "right" thing, this moral support of each other was seen to bond the two parties. See Social Approval.

The Lowe and Haws study demonstrates that moral support is a highly social and emotional phenomenon.

=== In therapy ===
A study conducted by Pfund et al. (2020) found sending a motivational letter to patients needing psychological treatment for gambling disorders increased the rate of first therapy session attendance. The control group received a reminder phone call only before their first session, but no motivational letter. The experimental condition group received the phone call and the letter; attendance from this group was 25% higher. (Control group has 51% attendance, motivational letter group had 76%). The motivational letter, which highlighted the expected outcomes of the therapy for the participant, is a form of successful moral support as it gives emotional support and prompts the individual to do the ‘right’ thing and follow through with treatment.

== See also ==
- Acknowledgment (creative arts and sciences)
- Morale
