= ScicosLab =

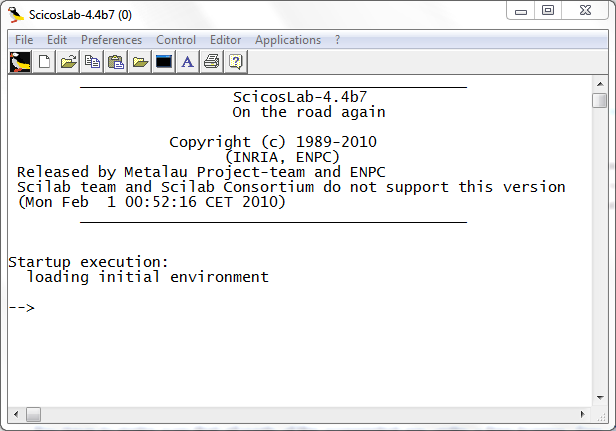
- Screenshot of ScicosLab 4.4 beta 7 running under Windows 7
- Developer(s): Metalau Project-team and ENPC
- Stable release: 4.4.2 / October 3, 2015; 9 years ago
- Operating system: Linux, Windows, Mac OS X
- Type: Technical computing
- License: Scilab License
- Website: www.scicoslab.org

ScicosLab is a software package providing a multi-platform environment for scientific computation. It is based on the official Scilab 4.x (BUILD4) distribution, and includes the modeling and simulation tool Scicos and a number of other toolboxes.

The latest stable version of ScicosLab is ScicosLab 4.4.2.

It is possible that Scilab/Scicos is currently the most complete alternative to commercial packages for dynamic systems modeling and simulation packages such as MATLAB/Simulink and MATRIXx/SystemBuild."

== Features ==
ScicosLab runs, and is available in binary format, for the main available platforms like Unix/Linux workstations, Microsoft Windows, and MacOSX. Scicoslab was based on Scilab and Scicos, but it was forked from them. Currently it is separated from the new versions evolution in order to maintain compatibility among them.

== See also ==
- Scilab
- Scicos
