= Hostile attribution bias =

Interpreting others' behavior as hostile

Hostile attribution bias, or hostile attribution of intent, is the tendency to interpret others' behaviors as having hostile intent, even when the behavior is ambiguous or benign. For example, a person with high levels of hostile attribution bias might, on noticing two people laughing, immediately assume that the people are laughing about them.

The term "hostile attribution bias" was coined in 1980 by Nasby, Hayden, and DePaulo who noticed, along with several other key pioneers in this research area (e.g., Kenneth A. Dodge), that a subgroup of children tend to attribute hostile intent to ambiguous social situations more often than other children. Since then, hostile attribution bias has been conceptualized as a bias of social information processing (similar to other attribution biases), including the way individuals perceive, interpret, and select responses to situations. While occasional hostile attribution bias is normative (particularly for younger children), researchers have found that individuals who exhibit consistent and high levels of hostile attribution bias across development are much more likely to engage in aggressive behavior (e.g., hitting/fighting, reacting violently, verbal or relational aggression) toward others.

In addition, hostile attribution bias is hypothesized to be one important pathway through which other risk factors, such as peer rejection or harsh parenting behavior, lead to aggression. For example, children exposed to peer teasing at school or child abuse at home are much more likely to develop high levels of hostile attribution bias, which then lead them to behave aggressively at school and/or at home. Thus, in addition to partially explaining one way aggression develops, hostile attribution bias also represents a target for the intervention and prevention of aggressive behaviors.

== History ==
The term hostile attribution bias first emerged in 1980 when researchers began noticing that some children, particularly aggressive and/or rejected children, tended to interpret social situations differently compared to other children. For example, Nasby and colleagues presented photographs of people to a group of aggressive adolescent boys (aged 10–16) and observed that a subgroup of these youth exhibited a consistent tendency to attribute hostile intent to the photographs, even when the cues were ambiguous or benign. Similarly, Kenneth A. Dodge and colleagues conducted a study on a sample of school-aged children between 3rd–5th grade and found that children who were rejected were much more likely than other children to exhibit hostile attributions of intent to ambiguous social situations (e.g., when a behavior could have been either accidental or intentional). Furthermore, Dodge and colleagues found that children with high hostile attribution bias then went on to exhibit the most aggressive behaviors later on.

Early studies investigating links between hostile attribution bias and aggression were somewhat mixed, with some studies reporting no significant effects or small effects and other studies reporting large effects. Since then, over 100 studies and a meta-analysis have documented an association between hostile attribution bias and aggressive behavior across various samples ranging in age, gender, race, countries, and clinical populations.

== Theoretical formulation ==
Hostile attribution bias is typically conceptualized within a social information processing framework, in which social information (e.g., during an interaction) is processed in a series of steps that leads to a behavioral reaction. Accurate social information processing requires a person to engage in six steps that occur in order.

1. Accurately encode information in the brain and store it in short-term memory. During this step, an individual will pay attention to and code specific stimuli/cues in their environment, including external factors (e.g., someone bumping into you; other people's reactions to the situation) and internal factors (e.g., your affective reaction to the situation).
2. Accurately interpret or give meaning to encoded information. During this step, an individual may decide if a behavior or situation was meant to be hostile or benign.
3. Decide a goal for the interaction
4. Generate potential responses
5. Evaluate potential responses and select the "optimal" response
6. Enact chosen response

Hostile attribution bias is theorized to result from deviations in any of these steps, including paying attention to and encoding biased information (e.g., only paying attention to cues suggestive of hostility), biases toward negative interpretations of social interactions (e.g., more likely to interpret situation as hostile), limited ability to generate a broad range of potential responses, and difficulty appropriately evaluating responses and selecting an optimal response. Furthermore, biases in any of the steps affect the rest of the steps. Hostile attribution bias has been particularly linked to step 2 of social information processing (i.e., interpretation of information), but is linked to impairments in other steps as well, including inaccurate perception/encoding of social situations and problems with generating a broad range of potential behavioral responses. For example, a child with high levels of hostile attribution bias may generate fewer potential responses than other children, and these responses may be limited to hostile or ineffective responses to a situation.

Dodge theorized that hostile attribution bias arises from an individual's hostile schemas about the world that are formed through an interaction between a child's neural dispositions and his/her early exposures to hostile socialization experiences. These experiences may include disrupted parental attachment, child abuse, exposure to family violence, peer rejection or victimization, and community violence.

== Measurement ==
In research settings, hostile attribution bias is typically measured with a laboratory task, in which participants are presented with staged interaction (live actors), video, picture, audio, or written presentations of ambiguous social situations. For example, an ambiguous social situation presented might be a video of a child opening a door, causing the door to knock over a tower of toys that another child was building. After the stimulus is presented, participants would be asked to make attributions about the intent of the actor (i.e., hostile vs. benign). (For example: "Do you think the girl who opened the door was trying to be mean, nice, or could have been mean or nice?"). Multiple trials are administered with various ambiguous scenarios, and these attributions are then used by the researchers to determine the level of the child's hostile attribution bias. Careful selection of stimuli and comparison of stimuli across mediums is helpful for accurately assessing an individual's level of hostile attribution bias. A meta-analysis investigating the link between hostile attribution bias and aggressive behavior found that the strongest effect sizes were linked with actual staging of social interactions, followed by audio presentation of stimuli, then video and picture presentation.

== Implications ==
=== Aggression ===
Substantial literature has documented a robust association between hostile attribution bias and aggression in youth. Hostile attribution bias is traditionally associated with overt physical aggression (e.g., hitting, fighting), such that higher levels of hostile attribution bias predict more aggressive behavior. In particular, much evidence suggests that hostile attribution bias is especially linked to "reactive aggression" (i.e., impulsive and "hot-blooded" aggression that reflects an angry retaliation to perceived provocation) rather than "proactive aggression" (i.e., unprovoked, planned/instrumental, or "cold-blooded" aggression). Beyond physical aggression, elevated hostile attribution bias is also associated with increased use of relational aggression (e.g., gossip, spreading rumors, social exclusion). This is particularly the case when youth attribute hostile intent to ambiguous relational situations (e.g., not receiving an invitation to a party or not receiving a response to a text).

=== Negative adult outcomes ===
Hostile attribution bias has also been documented in adult populations, and adults with high levels of hostile attribution bias are over four times more likely to die by the age of 50 than adults with low levels of hostile attribution bias. Hostile attribution bias is particularly linked to relational problems in adulthood, including marital conflict/violence and marital/relationship dissatisfaction. Finally, parents with high levels of hostile attribution bias are also much more likely to use harsh discipline and aggressive parenting, which may further contribute to the intergenerational continuity in hostile attribution bias and aggression across time.

=== Clinical implications for intervention ===
Hostile attribution bias has been tested as a malleable target for intervention for aggressive behaviors in youth, including in cognitive interventions designed to increase accurate identification of others' intentions and attribution of benign intentions. Relative success has been documented from these interventions in changing levels of hostile attribution bias, although actual enduring changes in aggressive behavior have been modest.

== See also ==
- Attribution bias
- Attribution (psychology)
- Psychological projection
