= James R. Millar =

American economist

- Born: 1936; San Antonio, Texas
- Died: November 30, 2008 (aged 72); Washington, D.C.

Academic background
- Education: Cornell University; University of Texas at Austin

Academic work
- Discipline: International affairs
- Institutions: George Washington University

James Robert Millar (1936 – November 30, 2008) was an American political scientist and economist. He was a renowned expert on the Soviet economy.

A native of San Antonio, Texas, Millar attended the University of Texas at Austin, graduating in 1958. He went on to pursue a doctorate degree at Cornell University, including a year spent as an exchange student at Moscow State University.

The National Council for Eurasian and East European Research awards the annual "James R. Millar Graduate Student Prize" for the best graduate student research paper in the humanities and social sciences regarding current or former communist regimes, in honor of Millar.

Professor Millar joined the faculty at the University of Illinois in Urbana-Champaign in the Department of Economics in 1965. He remained there until 1989 when he joined the faculty at George Washington University where he retired from in 2004. He died in 2008.

== Works ==
- James R. Millar; Sharon L. Wolchik (August 26, 1994). The Social Legacy of Communism. Cambridge University Press. pp. 87–. ISBN 978-0-521-46748-3.

== See also ==
- Soviet Interview Project
