= Social information processing (disambiguation) =

Social information processing is the information processing that occurs in large-scale and typically networked groups.

Social Information Processing may also refer to:

- Social information processing (theory), a theory that explains the nature of online interactions
- Social information processing (cognition), how individuals, especially children, establish (or fail to establish) successful relationships with society
