= Tail dependence =

In probability theory, the tail dependence of a pair of random variables is a measure of their comovements in the tails of the distributions. The concept is used in extreme value theory. Random variables that appear to exhibit no correlation can show tail dependence in extreme deviations. For instance, it is a stylized fact of stock returns that they commonly exhibit tail dependence.

== Definition ==
The lower tail dependence is defined as

$$\lambda_\ell = \lim_{q\rightarrow 0^+} \operatorname{P}(X_2 \le F_2^{-1}(q) \mid X_1 \le F_1^{-1}(q)).$$

where $F^{-1}(q)= {\rm inf} \{x \in \mathbb{R}: F(x)\geq q\}$, that is, the inverse of the cumulative probability distribution function for q.

The upper tail dependence is defined analogously as

$$\lambda_u = \lim_{q\rightarrow 1^-} \operatorname{P}(X_2 > F_2^{-1}(q) \mid X_1 > F_1^{-1}(q)).$$

== See also ==
- Correlation
- Dependence
