= P11 =

P11 may refer to:

== Aircraft ==
- Curtiss P-11 Hawk, a fighter aircraft of the United States Army Air Corps
- Lippisch P.11, a German bomber project
- Piaggio P.11, an Italian-built trainer
- PZL P.11, a fighter aircraft used by the Polish Air Force

== Pistols ==
- Heckler & Koch P11, an underwater pistol
- Heckler & Koch HK4, a pistol used by the German military as the "P11"
- Kel-Tec P-11, a semi-automatic pistol

== Science ==
- p11 protein
- Pioneer 11, a space probe
- Pseudomonas sRNA P11, a gene of the pathogen Pseudomonas aeruginosa

== Surface vehicles ==
- Infiniti G20 (P11), a compact executive car
- Nissan Primera (P11), a family car
- Norton P11, a motorcycle

== Other uses ==
- Kwekwe-Gokwe Highway, in Zimbabwe
- Ndengereko language
- NS Brendan Simbwaye (P11), a patrol boat of the Namibian Navy
- Painters Eleven, a Canadian artist group
- Papyrus 11, a biblical manuscript

== See also ==
- 11P (disambiguation)
