= Société genevoise d'instruments de physique =

Swiss precision-machinery manufacturer

Société Genevoise d'Instruments de Physique
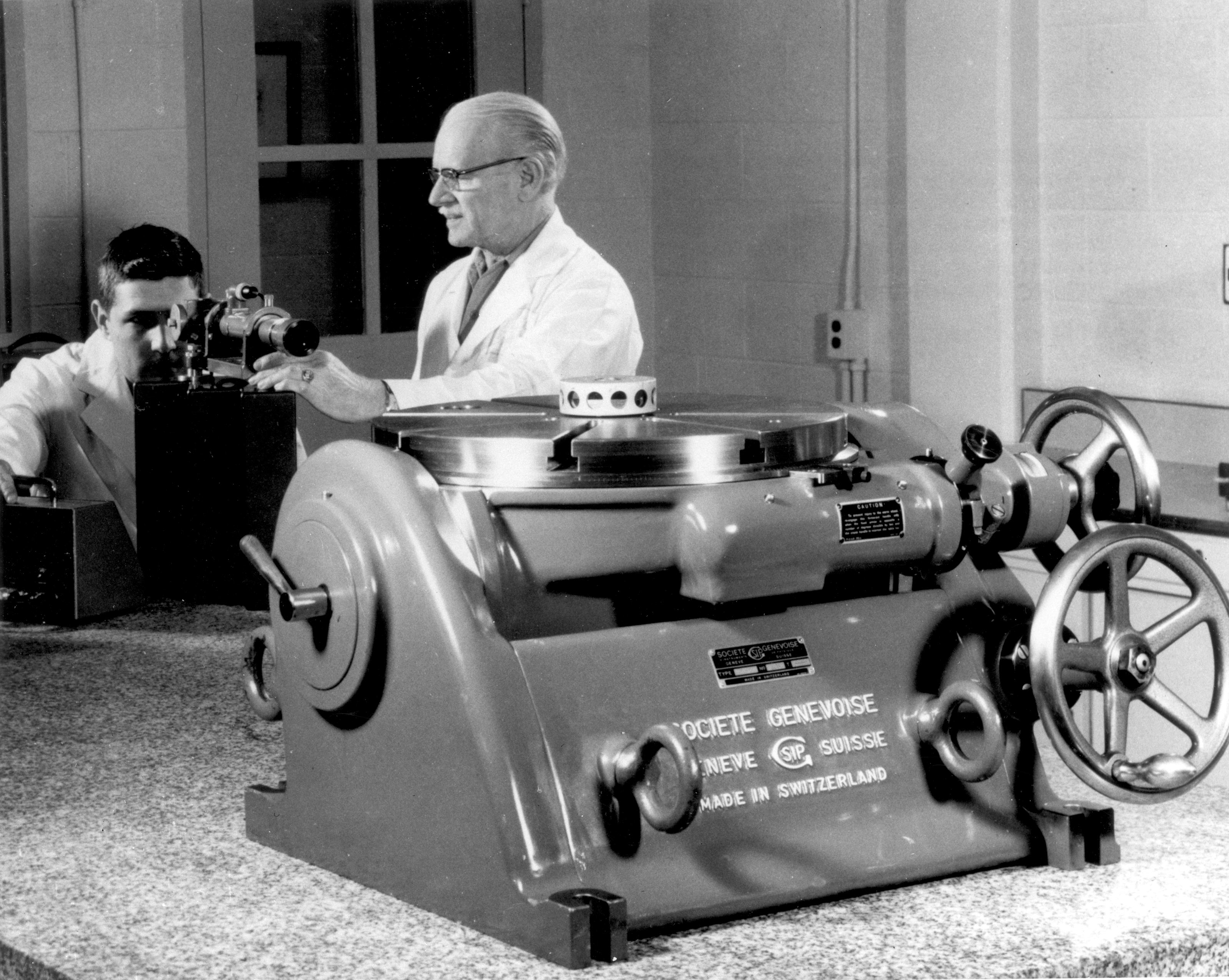
- Industry: Scientific instruments, machine tools
- Founded: 1862 in Geneva, Switzerland
- Founder: Auguste de la Rive, Marc Thury
- Fate: Acquired by StarragHeckert (2006)
- Headquarters: Geneva, Switzerland,
- Products: Scientific instruments, jig borers, precision measuring tools
- Number of employees: up to 1,600 (1969)

The Société genevoise d'instruments de physique (SIP) was a Swiss manufacturer of scientific instruments and precision machinery based in Geneva.

== History ==
The company was founded in 1862 by the Genevan scientists Auguste de la Rive and Marc Thury for the manufacture of scientific instruments. From 1870, under the impetus of Théodore Turrettini, it diversified its activities into the new energy sectors (hydraulic motors, refrigeration installations, electricity meters), as well as into metrology (precision rules).

This threefold expertise lay behind the development in 1921 of a machine tool that would contribute to the rise of series production in mechanical engineering: the jig borer, called the "MP" (machine à pointer), capable of machining to a precision of the order of a thousandth of a millimeter. A genuine technological feat, this product raised the SIP to the rank of the most prestigious machine builders in the world. After employing up to 1,600 people (1969), the company—constrained by its engineering culture—struggled to adapt to the economic changes that affected the sector from 1970. In 1990 the SIP left its Plainpalais site for Satigny. In 2006, when it had only some forty employees left, it was acquired by the StarragHeckert group.

== Bibliography ==
- Au cours de 90 années…, 1952
- B. Frommel, S. Fischer, La SIP, exhibition catalogue, Geneva, 2005
