= Stranger in Paradise =

Stranger in Paradise or Strangers in Paradise may refer to:

== Literature ==
- Stranger in Paradise (novel), a 2008 crime novel by Robert B. Parker
- "Stranger in Paradise" (short story), a 1974 short story by Isaac Asimov

== Music ==
- Stranger in Paradise (Peter Bernstein album), 2003
- "Stranger in Paradise" (song), a popular song from the musical Kismet (1953), based on "Polovtsian Dances" from Borodin's Prince Igor
- "Stranger in Paradise" (1987), a song by Diana Ross from Red Hot Rhythm & Blues

== Other media ==
- Strangers in Paradise (1984 film), a 1984 science fiction film directed by Ulli Lommel
- A Stranger in Paradise, a 2013 American film directed by Corrado Boccia
- Strangers in Paradise, a comic book series by Terry Moore
- "Strangers in Paradise" (The Detectives), a 1993 television episode

== See also ==
- Stranger Than Paradise, a 1984 film by Jim Jarmusch
- Stranger of Paradise: Final Fantasy Origin, a 2022 video game
