= Scilab Image Processing =

SIP: Scilab Image Processing
- Original author(s): Ricardo Fabbri
- Developer(s): Lab Macambira team, Zhang Cheng, Ricardo Fabbri, Nivaldo Bondanca, Fernando Gorodscy
- Stable release: 0.5.6 / August 23, 2011
- Written in: C, Scilab
- Operating system: Linux, UNIX, Windows
- Type: Scilab Toolbox
- License: GPL
- Website: siptoolbox.sourceforge.net/

SIP is a toolbox for processing images in Scilab. SIP is meant to be a free, complete, and useful image toolbox for Scilab. Its goals include tasks such as filtering, blurring, edge detection, thresholding, histogram manipulation, segmentation, mathematical morphology, and color image processing.

Though SIP is still in early development it can currently import and output image files in many formats including BMP, JPEG, GIF, PNG, TIFF, XPM, and PCX. SIP uses ImageMagick to accomplish this.

SIP is licensed under the GPL.
