= Scilab =

Open-source numerical computation software

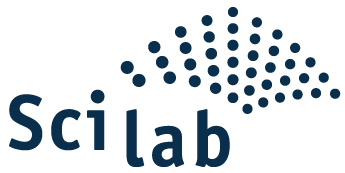

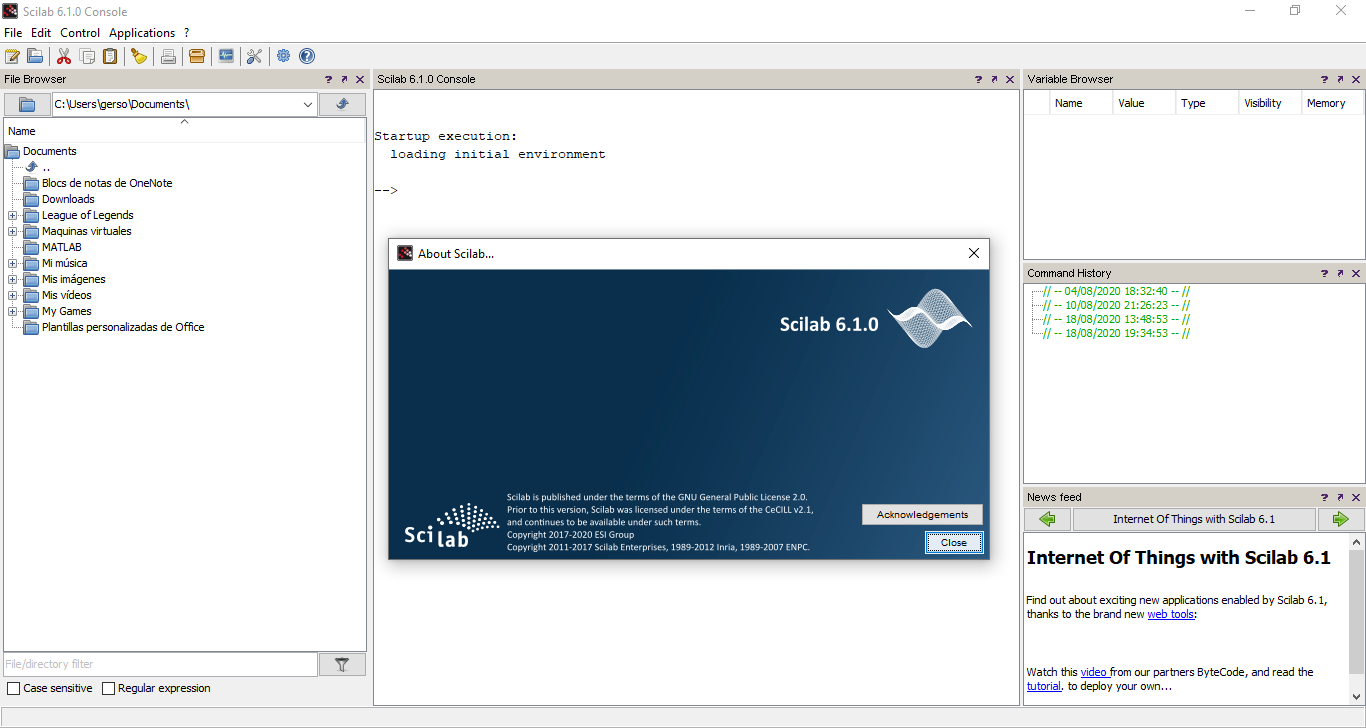
- Screenshot of Scilab 6.1
- Developer: Dassault Systèmes
- Stable release: 2027.0.0 / 15 October 2026; 32 days ago
- Written in: Scilab, C, C++, Java, Fortran
- Operating system: BSDs (e.g., FreeBSD), Linux, macOS, Windows
- Available in: English, German, Spanish, French, Italian, Japanese, Portuguese (Brazil), Russian, Ukrainian, Chinese, Czech, Polish
- Type: Technical computing
- License: GPLv2, previously CeCILL
- Website: www.scilab.org
- Repository: gitlab.com/scilab/scilab

Scilab is a free and open-source, cross-platform numerical computational package and a high-level, numerically oriented programming language. It can be used for signal processing, statistical analysis, image enhancement, fluid dynamics simulations, numerical optimization, and modeling, simulation of explicit and implicit dynamical systems and (if the corresponding toolbox is installed) symbolic manipulations.

Scilab is one of the two major open-source alternatives to MATLAB, the other one being GNU Octave. Scilab puts less emphasis on syntactic compatibility with MATLAB than Octave does, but it is similar enough that some authors suggest that it is easy to transfer skills between the two systems when coupled with Xcos.

== Introduction ==
Scilab is a high-level, numerically oriented programming language. The language provides an interpreted programming environment, with matrices as the main data type. By using matrix-based computation, dynamic typing, and automatic memory management, many numerical problems may be expressed in a reduced number of code lines, as compared to similar solutions using traditional languages, such as Fortran, C, or C++. This allows users to rapidly construct models for a range of mathematical problems. While the language provides simple matrix operations such as multiplication, the Scilab package also provides a library of high-level operations such as correlation and complex multidimensional arithmetic.

Scilab also includes a free package called Xcos for modeling and simulation of explicit and implicit dynamical systems, including both continuous and discrete sub-systems. Xcos is the open source equivalent to Simulink from the MathWorks.

As the syntax of Scilab is similar to MATLAB, Scilab includes a source code translator for assisting the conversion of code from MATLAB to Scilab. Scilab is available free of cost under an open source license. Due to the open source nature of the software, some user contributions have been integrated into the main program.

Object oriented programming was introduced in the Scilab 2026.0.0 release with the classdef command.

== Syntax ==
Scilab syntax is largely based on the MATLAB language. The simplest way to execute Scilab code is to type it in at the prompt, --> , in the graphical command window. In this way, Scilab can be used as an interactive mathematical shell.

Hello World! in Scilab:

disp('Hello World');

Plotting a 3D surface function:

// A simple plot of z = f(x,y)
t=[0:0.3:2*%pi]';
// note: t is a column vector, t' is a row vector
z=sin(t)*cos(t');
// the dyadic product of sin(t) and cos(t') yields matrix z
plot3d(t,t',z)

Determining the equivalent single index corresponding to a given set of subscript values:

function I=sub2ind(dims,varargin) 
//I = sub2ind(dims,i1,i2,..) returns the linear index equivalent to the
//row,  column, ... subscripts in the arrays i1,i2,..  for an matrix of
//size dims.
 
//I = sub2ind(dims,Mi) returns the linear index
//equivalent to the n subscripts in the columns of the matrix Mi for a matrix
//of size dims.
 
  d=[1;cumprod(matrix(dims(1:$-1),-1,1))]
  for i=1:size(varargin)
    if varargin(i)==[] then I=[],return,end
  end

  if size(varargin)==1 then //subindices are the columns of the argument
    I=(varargin(1)-1)*d+1
  else //subindices are given as separated arguments
    I=1
    for i=1:size(varargin)
      I=I+(varargin(i)-1)*d(i)
    end
  end
endfunction

== Toolboxes ==
Scilab has many contributed toolboxes for different tasks, such as

- Scilab Image Processing Toolbox (SIP) and its variants (such as SIVP)
- Scilab Wavelet Toolbox
- Scilab Java and .NET Module
- Scilab Remote Access Module

More are available on ATOMS Portal or the Scilab forge.

== History ==
Scilab was created in 1990 by researchers from INRIA and École nationale des ponts et chaussées (ENPC). It was initially named Ψlab (Psilab). The Scilab Consortium was formed in May 2003 to broaden contributions and promote Scilab as worldwide reference software in academia and industry. In July 2008, in order to improve the technology transfer, the Scilab Consortium joined the Digiteo Foundation.

Scilab 5.1, the first release compiled for Mac, was available in early 2009, and supported Mac OS X 10.5, a.k.a. Leopard. Thus, OSX 10.4, Tiger, was never supported except by porting from sources. Linux and Windows builds had been released since the beginning, with Solaris support dropped with version 3.1.1, and HP-UX dropped with version 4.1.2 after spotty support.

In June 2010, the Consortium announced the creation of Scilab Enterprises. Scilab Enterprises develops and markets, directly or through an international network of affiliated services providers, a comprehensive set of services for Scilab users. Scilab Enterprises also develops and maintains the Scilab software. The ultimate goal of Scilab Enterprises is to help make the use of Scilab more effective and easy.

In February 2017 Scilab 6.0.0 was released which leveraged the latest C++ standards and lifted memory allocation limitations.

Since July 2012, Scilab is developed and published by Scilab Enterprises and in early 2017 Scilab Enterprises was acquired by Virtual Prototyping pioneer ESI Group

Since 2019 and Scilab 6.0.2, the University of Technology of Compiègne provides resources to build and maintain the macOS version.

After 5 years of Scilab versions made by ESI Group, Scilab operational team joined Dassault Systèmes in 2022. The Scilab versions from then on have been named by the year, the first one being scilab-2023.0.0. Typically two releases haves been published per year, the current being scilab-2026.1.0.

== Scilab Cloud App & Scilab Cloud API ==
Since 2016 Scilab can be embedded in a browser and be called via an interface written in Scilab or an API.

This new deployment method has the notable advantages of masking code & data as well as providing large computational power.

These features have not been included in the open source version of Scilab and are still proprietary developments.

== See also ==
- SageMath
- List of numerical-analysis software
- SimulationX
