= StarragTornos =

Swiss industrial tool manufacturing company

StarragTornos Group AG
- Type: Aktiengesellschaft
- ISIN: CH0002361068
- Industry: Machining
- Founded: 1897
- Headquarters: Rorschacherberg, Switzerland
- Key people: Martin Buyle; Jens Thing; Markus Jäger
- Revenue: CHF 442.09 million (2025)
- Number of employees: 1859 (2025)
- Website: www.starrag.com

The Starrag Tornos Group (official spelling: StarragTornos), headquartered in Rorschacherberg, is a Swiss industrial company operating internationally in the field of precision machine tools. The group was entered into the commercial register on 7 December 2023 following the merger of Starrag Group and Tornos. In 2025, the Starrag division (formerly Starrag Group) employed 1,254 people across nine production sites in Switzerland, Germany, France, the United Kingdom, and India, and marketed its products under ten brands. The Tornos division employed 605 people at several production sites. StarragTornos Group AG is listed on the SIX Swiss Exchange.

== History ==
=== Starrag Group ===
Starrag Group Logo

Former logo (until February 2012) after integration of Dörries Scharmann Technologie GmbH (DST)

The history of Starrag dates back to 1897 when Henry Levy founded a workshop in Rorschacherberg to manufacture threading machines for the textile industry. These threading machines eliminated the need for manual threading of embroidery machines, a task that had predominantly been performed by child labour. By 1910, the workshop had produced 3000 threading machines and other machines for the textile industry.

After the outbreak of World War I in 1914 caused a textile crisis in Eastern Switzerland, the company shifted its focus to the production of turret and parallel lathes in 1917. From 1920 onwards, the company began manufacturing milling machines, and in 1921, it was renamed Starrfräsmaschinen AG Henri Levy, later becoming Starrfräsmaschinen AG in 1925. By this time, the company had over 300 employees and relocated to a new facility within Rorschacherberg.

After the death of founder Henri Levy in 1947, the company continued to grow. In the post-war years, Starrfräsmaschinen AG established itself in its field with the world's first 5-axis milling machine and employed around 1200 workers by the early 1960s.

In 1998, the company went public on the stock exchange. That same year, Starrfräsmaschinen AG acquired Heckert Werkzeugmaschinen GmbH in Chemnitz and changed its name to Starrag. In 2000, the company adopted a holding structure under the umbrella of StarragHeckert Holding AG, and the subsidiary StarragHeckert AG was established. This was followed in 2006 by the acquisition of a controlling interest in the company Toolroom Technology Limited and all the activities of Société d'Instruments de Précision SA (SIP).

In January 2011, StarragHeckert Holding AG acquired the machine tool manufacturer Dörries Scharmann Technologie, consisting of Dörries, Scharmann, Droop + Rein, Ecospeed and Berthiez, from the insolvent A-Tec Industries. In 2012, StarragHeckert AG was renamed Starrag AG. The same year, Swiss machine manufacturer Bumotec SA was acquired, a company producing machines for the watchmaking industry.

=== Tornos ===
Tornos was founded in 1880 in Moutier by the mechanic Nicolas Junker and produced the first machines for manufacturing small parts for the watchmaking industry. In 1886, the company, then named Junker et Cie., launched mass-produced lathes on the market. Junker also further developed the so-called Swiss-type lathe. In 1904, Junker’s son Emile took over the business, which had fallen into financial difficulties. The following year, Emile Junker filed for the company’s bankruptcy.

In 1914, the Tornos company was formed from the remnants of the Junker et Cie. company and began manufacturing automatic lathes. Tornos competed with the companies of Joseph Pétermann and former Junker apprentice André Bechler. In 1971, Tornos acquired the Pétermann plant, and in the following years also Bechler's company, leading to the formation of Tornos-Bechler SA in 1981. The renaming of Tornos-Bechler SA to Tornos SA in 2001 brought the three former competitors Tornos, Pétermann and Bechler together under a single company name. The company was listed on the stock exchange in the same year.

In 2008, Tornos acquired the machine manufacturer Almac in La Chaux-de-Fonds, Switzerland. The company also opened further production facilities in Xi'an, China, and Taichung, Taiwan, in 2014. A plant with 40 employees in Poland followed in 2022.

=== StarragTornos ===
The parent company of Starrag AG, Starrag Group Holding AG, merged with Tornos Holding AG in 2023 to form the StarragTornos Group. As a result, Starrag AG became a subsidiary of the StarragTornos Group.

== Company structure ==
StarragTornos Group AG was entered into the commercial register on 7 December 2023. Its share capital amounts to CHF 46.4 million. In the 2025 financial year, the company generated sales of approximately CHF 442 million, with an operating result (EBIT) of CHF 6.02 million and a net profit of CHF 5.34 million. At that time, the company employed 1,859 people.

The company is based in Rorschacherberg. It is managed by Martin Buyle, Markus Jäger and Jens Thing. Jäger is responsible for the company’s finance. Buyle is in charge of the Starrag division, which covers the field of High Performance Machining. Thing heads the Tornos division, which includes CNC sliding headstock automatic lathes, multi-spindle machines, and machining centres for complex precision parts.

=== Shareholders (as at 2025) ===
As at 31 December 2025, 2,037 shareholders were listed in the company’s register of shareholders. The following shareholders held more than 5% of the voting rights at that time:

Shareholder structure
Shareholder	Shares
Heirs of Walter Fust	52.11%
Eduard Stürm AG	5.69%
Michel Rollier, Le Landeron / RIM Holding SA	5.53%

== Activities ==
The StarragTornos Group develops and markets precision machines for milling, turning, drilling, grinding, and the machining of workpieces made of metal, composite materials, and ceramics. In particular, the company manufactures 5-axis machining centres with high material removal rates for the production of turbine blades, impellers, blisks, and complex structural components. StarragTornos offers complete manufacturing packages, including software, clamping devices, tool-holders, and peripheral equipment. These machines and products are used in the aerospace industry, power generation, transportation, and precision engineering.

StarragTornos' machines produce parts that are used, amongst others, in the Airbus A380 wide-body aircraft or the Boeing 787 Dreamliner.

Brand	Machines/Products
Starrag	5-axis horizontal milling machining centres
Heckert	4- and 5-axis horizontal milling centres
Dörries	Vertical turning machines
Scharmann	Horizontal milling centres, boring and milling machines
Ecospeed	Simultaneous 5-axis machining centres
SIP	3- to 5-axis ultra-precision milling centres and jig boring machines
Droop + Rein	Large machining centres in gantry design
Berthiez	Turning and grinding machines
WMW	4-axis horizontal milling centres
TTL	Software applications for milling machining
Bumotec	Milling and turning machines for very small components in watchmaking, jewellery and medical technology
