= 11P =

11P, 11.P, etc. may refer to:

- 11p, the shorter arm of human chromosome 11
- 11P/Tempel-Swift-LINEAR, a comet
- IEEE 802.11p, an 802.11 wireless access protocol for vehicular environments
- SpaceShipOne flight 11P, a flight of SpaceShipOne

== See also ==
- P11 (disambiguation)
