= Tolerance relation =

Math relation that is reflexive and symmetric

In universal algebra and lattice theory, a tolerance relation on an algebraic structure is a reflexive symmetric relation that is compatible with all operations of the structure. Thus a tolerance is like a congruence, except that the assumption of transitivity is dropped. On a set, an algebraic structure with empty family of operations, tolerance relations are simply reflexive symmetric relations. A set that possesses a tolerance relation can be described as a tolerance space. Tolerance relations provide a convenient general tool for studying indiscernibility/indistinguishability phenomena. The importance of those for mathematics had been first recognized by Poincaré.

== Definitions ==
A tolerance relation on an algebraic structure $(A,F)$ is usually defined to be a reflexive symmetric relation on $A$ that is compatible with every operation in $F$. A tolerance relation can also be seen as a cover of $A$ that satisfies certain conditions. The two definitions are equivalent, since for a fixed algebraic structure, the tolerance relations in the two definitions are in one-to-one correspondence. The tolerance relations on an algebraic structure $(A,F)$ form an algebraic lattice $\operatorname{Tolr}(A)$ under inclusion. Since every congruence relation is a tolerance relation, the congruence lattice $\operatorname{Cong}(A)$ is a subset of the tolerance lattice $\operatorname{Tolr}(A)$, but $\operatorname{Cong}(A)$ is not necessarily a sublattice of $\operatorname{Tolr}(A)$.

=== As binary relations ===
A tolerance relation on an algebraic structure $(A,F)$ is a binary relation $\sim$ on $A$ that satisfies the following conditions.

- (Reflexivity) $a\sim a$ for all $a\in A$
- (Symmetry) if $a\sim b$ then $b\sim a$ for all $a,b\in A$
- (Compatibility) for each $n$-ary operation $f\in F$ and $a_1,\dots,a_n,b_1,\dots,b_n\in A$, if $a_i\sim b_i$ for each $i=1,\dots,n$ then $f(a_1,\dots,a_n)\sim f(b_1,\dots,b_n)$. That is, the set $\{(a,b)\colon a\sim b\}$ is a subalgebra of the direct product $A^2$ of two $A$.

A congruence relation is a tolerance relation that is also transitive.

=== As covers ===
A tolerance relation on an algebraic structure $(A,F)$ is a cover $\mathcal C$ of $A$ that satisfies the following three conditions.

- For every $C\in\mathcal C$ and $\mathcal S\subseteq\mathcal C$, if $\textstyle C\subseteq\bigcup\mathcal S$, then $\textstyle\bigcap\mathcal S\subseteq C$.
  - In particular, no two distinct elements of $\mathcal C$ are comparable. (To see this, take $\mathcal S=\{D\}$.)
- For every $S\subseteq A$, if $S$ is not contained in any set in $\mathcal C$, then there is a two-element subset $\{s,t\}\subseteq S$ such that $\{s,t\}$ is not contained in any set in $\mathcal C$.
- For every $n$-ary $f\in F$ and $C_1,\dots,C_n\in\mathcal C$, there is a $(f/{\sim})(C_1,\dots,C_n)\in\mathcal C$ such that $\{f(c_1,\dots,c_n)\colon c_i\in C_i\}\subseteq(f/{\sim})(C_1,\dots,C_n)$. (Such a $(f/{\sim})(C_1,\dots,C_n)$ need not be unique.)

Every partition of $A$ satisfies the first two conditions, but not conversely. A congruence relation is a tolerance relation that also forms a set partition.

=== Equivalence of the two definitions ===
Let $\sim$ be a tolerance binary relation on an algebraic structure $(A,F)$. Let $A/{\sim}$ be the family of maximal subsets $C\subseteq A$ such that $c\sim d$ for every $c,d\in C$. Using graph theoretical terms, $A/{\sim}$ is the set of all maximal cliques of the graph $(A,\sim)$. If $\sim$ is a congruence relation, $A/{\sim}$ is just the quotient set of equivalence classes. Then $A/{\sim}$ is a cover of $A$ and satisfies all the three conditions in the cover definition. (The last condition is shown using Zorn's lemma.) Conversely, let $\mathcal C$ be a cover of $A$ and suppose that $\mathcal C$ forms a tolerance on $A$. Consider a binary relation $\sim_{\mathcal C}$ on $A$ for which $a\sim_{\mathcal C}b$ if and only if $a,b\in C$ for some $C\in\mathcal C$. Then $\sim_{\mathcal C}$ is a tolerance on $A$ as a binary relation. The map ${\sim}\mapsto A/{\sim}$ is a one-to-one correspondence between the tolerances as binary relations and as covers whose inverse is $\mathcal C\mapsto{\sim_{\mathcal C}}$. Therefore, the two definitions are equivalent. A tolerance is transitive as a binary relation if and only if it is a partition as a cover. Thus the two characterizations of congruence relations also agree.

=== Quotient algebras over tolerance relations ===
Let $(A,F)$ be an algebraic structure and let $\sim$ be a tolerance relation on $A$. Suppose that, for each $n$-ary operation $f\in F$ and $C_1,\dots,C_n\in A/{\sim}$, there is a unique $(f/{\sim})(C_1,\dots,C_n)\in A/{\sim}$ such that

$$\{f(c_1,\dots,c_n)\colon c_i\in C_i\}\subseteq(f/{\sim})(C_1,\dots,C_n)$$

Then this provides a natural definition of the quotient algebra

$$(A/{\sim},F/{\sim})$$

of $(A,F)$ over $\sim$. In the case of congruence relations, the uniqueness condition always holds true and the quotient algebra defined here coincides with the usual one.

A main difference from congruence relations is that for a tolerance relation the uniqueness condition may fail, and even if it does not, the quotient algebra may not inherit the identities defining the variety that $(A,F)$ belongs to, so that the quotient algebra may fail to be a member of the variety again. Therefore, for a variety $\mathcal V$ of algebraic structures, we may consider the following two conditions.

- (Tolerance factorability) for any $(A,F)\in\mathcal V$ and any tolerance relation $\sim$ on $(A,F)$, the uniqueness condition is true, so that the quotient algebra $(A/{\sim},F/{\sim})$ is defined.
- (Strong tolerance factorability) for any $(A,F)\in\mathcal V$ and any tolerance relation $\sim$ on $(A,F)$, the uniqueness condition is true, and $(A/{\sim},F/{\sim})\in\mathcal V$.

Every strongly tolerance factorable variety is tolerance factorable, but not vice versa.

== Examples ==
=== Sets ===
A set is an algebraic structure with no operations at all. In this case, tolerance relations are simply reflexive symmetric relations and it is trivial that the variety of sets is strongly tolerance factorable.

=== Groups ===
On a group, every tolerance relation is a congruence relation. In particular, this is true for all algebraic structures that are groups when some of their operations are forgot, e.g. rings, vector spaces, modules, Boolean algebras, etc. Therefore, the varieties of groups, rings, vector spaces, modules and Boolean algebras are also strongly tolerance factorable trivially.

=== Lattices ===
For a tolerance relation $\sim$ on a lattice $L$, every set in $L/{\sim}$ is a convex sublattice of $L$. Thus, for all $A\in L/{\sim}$, we have

$$A=\mathop\uparrow A\cap\mathop\downarrow A$$

In particular, the following results hold.

- $a\sim b$ if and only if $a\vee b\sim a\wedge b$.
- If $a\sim b$ and $a\le c,d\le b$, then $c\sim d$.

The variety of lattices is strongly tolerance factorable. That is, given any lattice $(L,\vee_L,\wedge_L)$ and any tolerance relation $\sim$ on $L$, for each $A,B\in L/{\sim}$ there exist unique $A\vee_{L/{\sim}}B,A\wedge_{L/{\sim}}B\in L/{\sim}$ such that

$$\{a\vee_Lb\colon a\in A,\;b\in B\}\subseteq A\vee_{L/{\sim}}B$$
$$\{a\wedge_Lb\colon a\in A,\;b\in B\}\subseteq A\wedge_{L/{\sim}}B$$

and the quotient algebra

$$(L/{\sim},\vee_{L/{\sim}},\wedge_{L/{\sim}})$$

is a lattice again.

In particular, we can form quotient lattices of distributive lattices and modular lattices over tolerance relations. However, unlike in the case of congruence relations, the quotient lattices need not be distributive or modular again. In other words, the varieties of distributive lattices and modular lattices are tolerance factorable, but not strongly tolerance factorable. Actually, every subvariety of the variety of lattices is tolerance factorable, and the only strongly tolerance factorable subvariety other than itself is the trivial subvariety (consisting of one-element lattices). This is because every lattice is isomorphic to a sublattice of the quotient lattice over a tolerance relation of a sublattice of a direct product of two-element lattices.

== See also ==
- Approximation
- Dependency relation
- Quasitransitive relation—a generalization to formalize indifference in social choice theory
- Rough set
