= Soviet Interview Project =

Sociological research survey

The Soviet Interview Project (SIP) was a research project conducted in the early 1980s. The project's principal aim was to learn about the life in the Soviet Union, which in turn would contribute to the disciplines of Sovietology, political science, economics and sociology.

The study had three principal goals:

- Conducting a study of contemporary Soviet society based upon interviews with recent immigrants now living in the United States.
- Promoting the involvement of young scholars so that the field of Soviet studies developed.
- Making the data and research products developed available to all interested scholars.

The Soviet Interview Project had its origins in a meeting at the Kennan Institute in August 1979, where senior academic scholars and U.S. government specialists discussed the feasibility of such a project. One of the main obstacles was the "Kissinger rule", named after U.S. secretary of state Henry Kissinger who had established a policy against the use of federal funds for studies of emigrants from the USSR. The Kissinger rule was revoked after a successful lobbying effort, and a design phase proposal was funded by the National Council for Soviet and East European Research in November 1979.

SIP made arrangements with the Department of Defense, the Central Intelligence Agency and the Department of State during the summer of 1981 so that the National Council could fund the project. The coordinating agency within the U.S. federal government was the Bureau of Intelligence and Research (INR) of the U.S. Department of State.

The research team was headed by James R. Millar, economics professor at the University of Illinois at Urbana–Champaign. The team completed the draft of a general survey for the project in September 1981, developing an interdisciplinary questionnaire. The researchers decided to focus on the last “normal” period of life in the USSR, as applying for emigration could lead to marked changes in the applicant's life, thus introducing a possible bias.

The sampling frame for the SIP general survey was defined as all Soviet emigrants who arrived in the United States between January 1, 1979 and April 30, 1982, and who were between ages 21 and 70. 33,618 persons met the criteria, and 3,551 were included in the final sample. There were 2,793 respondents.

The field work for the general survey was conducted by the National Opinion Research Center.

Among the Soviet Interview Project's findings were that there was a positive relationship between education and unemployment in the USSR (as opposed to in the United States, where it was a negative relationship), that the Soviet wage system rewarded and penalized external political behavior, and that popular support for the Soviet regime was linked to the sense of material satisfaction and the perceived capability of the KGB.
