= Social information processing (cognition) =

Social information processing refers to a theory of how individuals, especially children, establish (or fail to establish) successful relationships with society. Studies show the parts of the brain which are active during the whole social interaction are the amygdala, ventromedial frontal cortices and right somatosensory-related cortex and others.

In a social situation, children match the facial expressions of anonymous people with memories of past experiences. This helps them perceive the mood or apparent nature of the person they have to interact with. Besides the facial give-aways, factors like body language can also play an important role in determining how to behave in a social situation.

When children encounter a social situation, a series of mental operations takes place before they respond. First they perceive the various features of the situation and comprehend the relevant ideas. Second, they try to attribute the information to every participant. Third, they generate answers and fourth, they select a response to finally act out the behavior.

There are two general forms of information processing: emotion and cognition. This can be explained by emotions being based on motivation, and cognition on knowledge. This notion can explain situations in society as it reflects how individuals are influenced by one another.

There are various social behaviors children process in sequence which include deciphering and understanding social signs, outlining goals, creations of response, decision of action, and behavior of action. This is the process model for children according to social information processing.
