= Irvine Master Plan =

The Irvine Master Plan are a series of documents created by the Irvine Company which planned Irvine, California, the largest privately planned suburban town to be built in the United States. It was created out of initial plans for a college town surrounding the University of California, Irvine. The plan has been criticised by urban planning experts and Larry Agran for creating high amounts of car dependency, and lack of public transport.

== Early history ==
The Irvine ranch was entirely agricultural land from the time of Spanish colonisation to 1960.

The University of California began searching for a site for a new campus, and through political connections, the Irvine ranch was identified as a potential area. The Irvine family donated 1000 acres for the University of California, Irvine, which would be surrounded by a community around it. The university and Irvine Company commissioned William Pereira to design a master plan for this new college town. Subsequently, planning continued to expand the town into agricultural land north of Interstate 405.

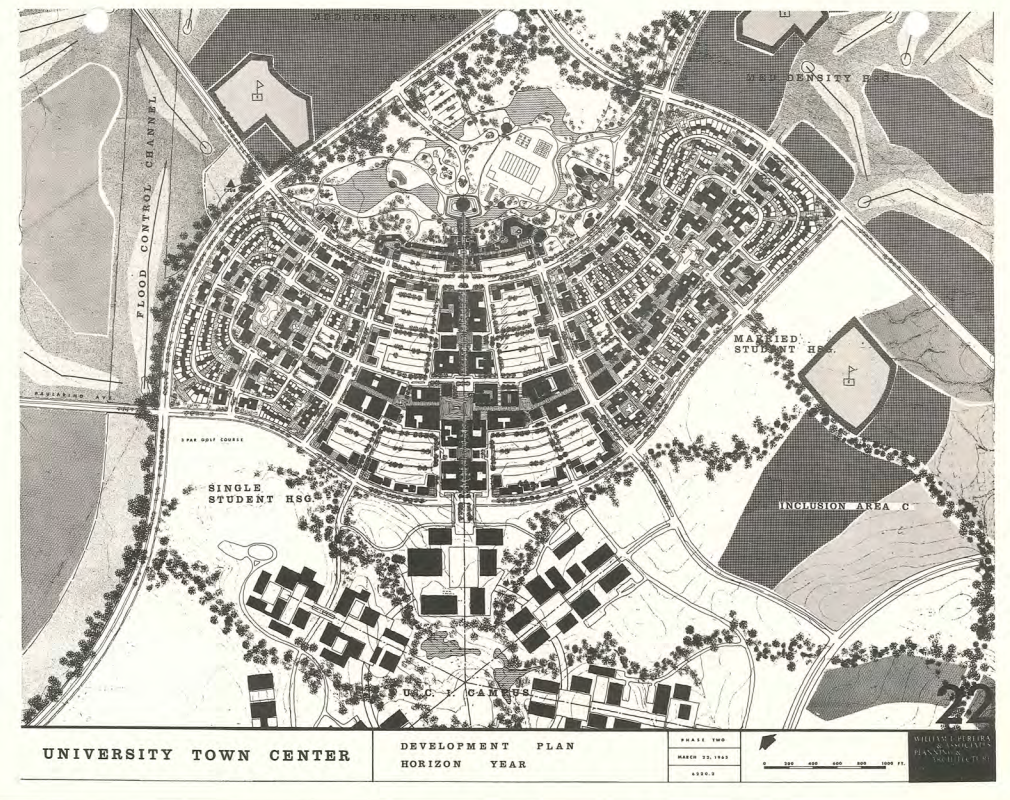
Initial design of University Town Center.

== Design ==
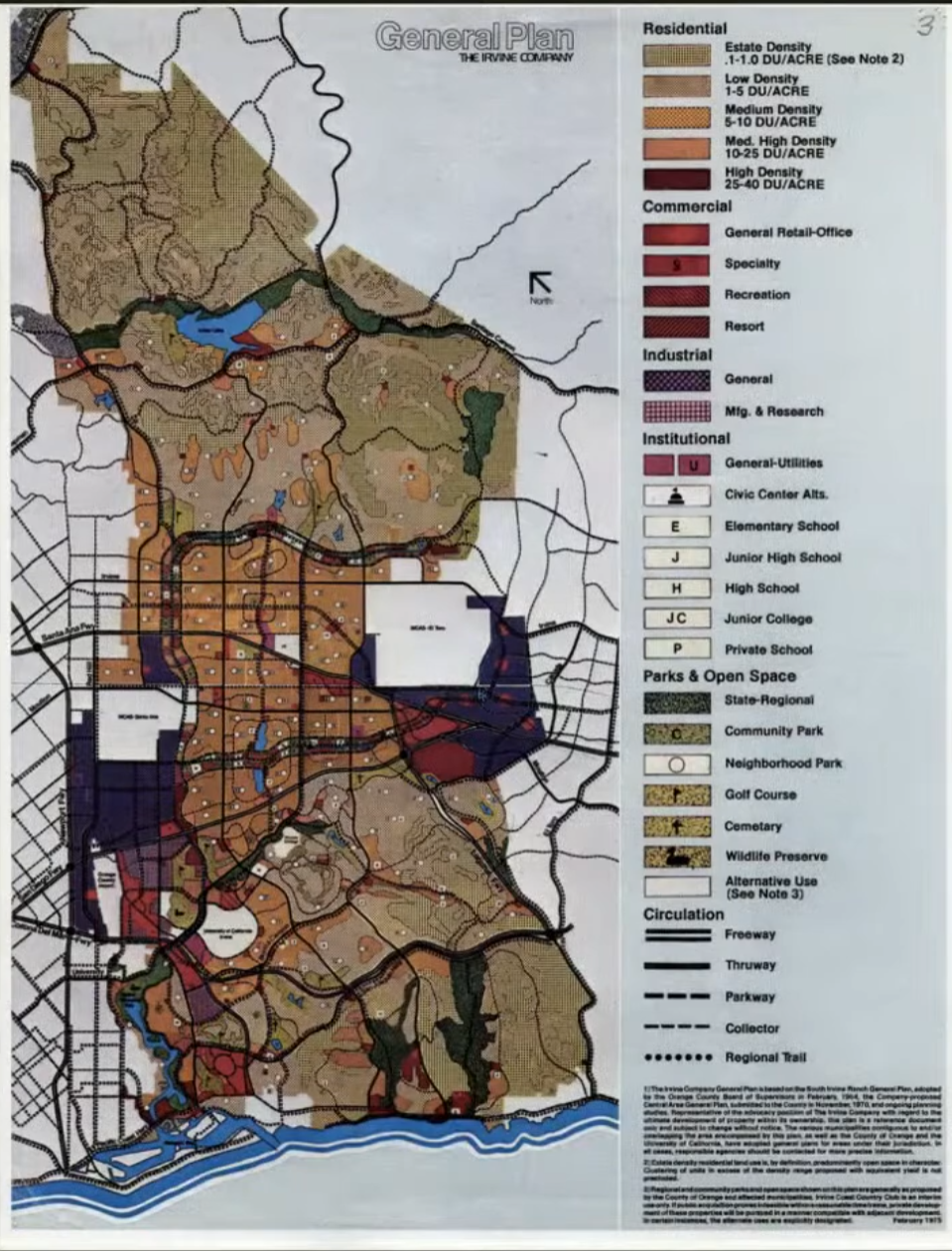
First general plan

The Irvine Master Plan was designed with mindset of opposing the suburban sprawl which defined Los Angeles, and other cities in the Southern California area. Several key elements define the master plan: Neighborhoods are organised in marketable and self-contained "villages" with unique architectural themes, elementary schools, parks, and local shopping centre within walking or cycling distance.

A network of wide "arterial roads" connects much of the city.

The use of landscaped greenspace, trails, and parks are in a much greater density compared to other cities. A distinctive streetscape was defined. For example, north–south arterial roads use conifer trees while east–west arterial roads use shorter deciduous trees.

The use of waterways and drainage spaces were also used to separate business areas from residential areas. The use of the west and east of the city were used for business parks while the centre was assigned to the village neighbourhood concept.

== Criticism ==
In urban planning analysis, Irvine is criticised for its extreme car dependency. In Ann Forsyth's analysis of Irvine, she states that despite the use of mixed use centers, pedestrian paths, and walkable neighbourhoods, it was not enough to shift trips away from cars. Residents are encouraged to use their automobile, often alone, for shopping and commuting. This contributes to high energy usage and carbon emissions. Irvine's mayor Larry Agran stated in 2026 that the Irvine Master Plan had failed in providing public transport and traffic management, "from day one, we should have required, associated with each development, that a transit project be part of the planning process."

Irvine's visual plan has also been criticised for architectural monotony and it's use of "irvine beige" as a building palette.

== See also ==
- Campus of UC Irvine
