= Campus of the University of California, Irvine =

College campus in Irvine, California, US

Coordinates: 33°38′46″N 117°50′34″W

The campus of the University of California, Irvine is known for its concentric layout with academic and service buildings arrayed around a central park, and for its Brutalist architecture.

== Layout ==
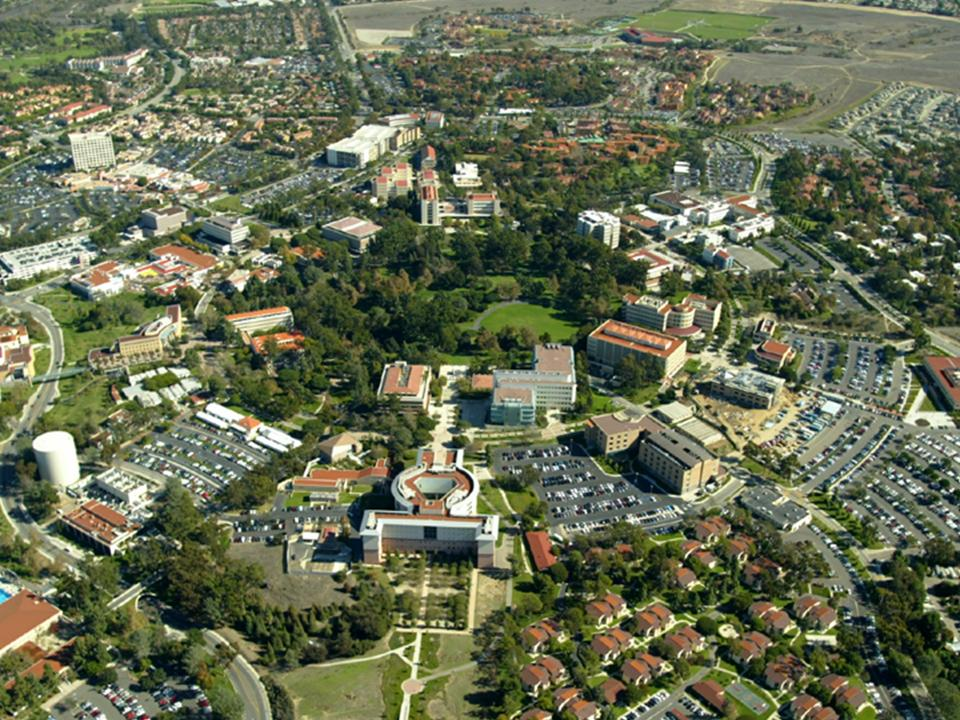
UCI's core campus and surrounding areas. Aldrich Park is in the center.

The campus was designed favoring large open spaces and decentralized, suburban facilities over the dense, urban layout of older campuses. It is primarily composed of 1960s Modernist/Futurist and Postmodern buildings set in a circle around a large central park. Satellite parking lots lie in another circle outside the main circle of buildings, with UCI's streets roughly laid out in a pattern of circles themselves. This layout is attributable to Chancellor Aldrich and fellow university planners, who conceived UCI as concentric circles of knowledge. UCI's master plan called for the central park (now known as Aldrich Park) to serve as the nucleus of the campus, with academic units moving outward based on educational attainment (most undergraduate schools are in the central campus, while graduate and professional schools are located further away).

Aldrich Park is composed of a network of paved and dirt pathways that connect the campus. Much of Aldrich Park serves as a home for large numbers of thickly wooded trees indigenous to the local Mediterranean climate, and as a whole it is landscaped meticulously. Its geographical center hosts a garden and plaque commemorating UCI's founding, which marks the site of an unbuilt carillon tower known as the Centrum. For students, Aldrich Park is a popular meeting place, study area, and convenient field for sports or other activities. Many large-scale outdoor concerts and events are held such as Anteater Involvement Fair and the welcome week concert.

Aldrich Park is completely encircled by a pedestrian walkway known as Ring Road, which is the main pedestrian thoroughfare on campus. Ring Road has a diameter of 256m and a circumference of 1609m, with its lowest point at 23m and highest point at 38m.

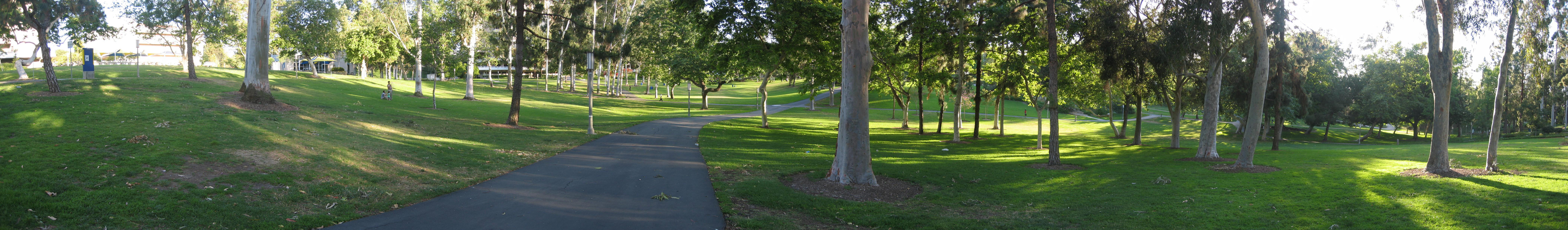
Panoramic view of Aldrich Park

Each School at UCI (except for the School of the Arts, School of Business, College of Medicine) is located on its own segment of Ring Road. Starting from the main Langson Library and Administration building and going clockwise, Ring Road passes through Social Sciences, Engineering, Physical Sciences, Biological Sciences, and Humanities. These schools also have their own central plaza on Ring Road, which serves as localized meeting areas. These central plazas bisect the schools and lead to smaller plazas, which in turn lead to paths in Aldrich Park. These smaller plazas usually serve as quieter study areas, with one (in the School of Physical Sciences), hosting Infinity Fountain, which has the shape of a Möbius strip. UCI also employs two bridges on Ring Road (the Engineering Bridge and Humanities Bridge, respectively), which allow for entrances to Aldrich Park; at the foot of the Humanities Bridge is the Jao Family Sculpture Garden, which hosts depictions of notable Chinese philosophers.

Away from the central campus, UCI has a more suburban layout occupied by sprawling residential and educational complexes, some of which are on steep hills. These are linked to the central campus with four pedestrian bridges, which access University Center, the Palo Verde housing complex, the College of Medicine, and School of the Arts. Further expedient travel beyond the bridges becomes impractical without the use of a bicycle, automobile, or public transportation. And despite being heavily built over the past 40 years, a large portion of the outer campus remains undeveloped, with hilly grasslands and brush prevailing. This gives UCI the opportunity to develop for years to come, while many other UC campuses have reached their permanent build-out.

== Surroundings ==
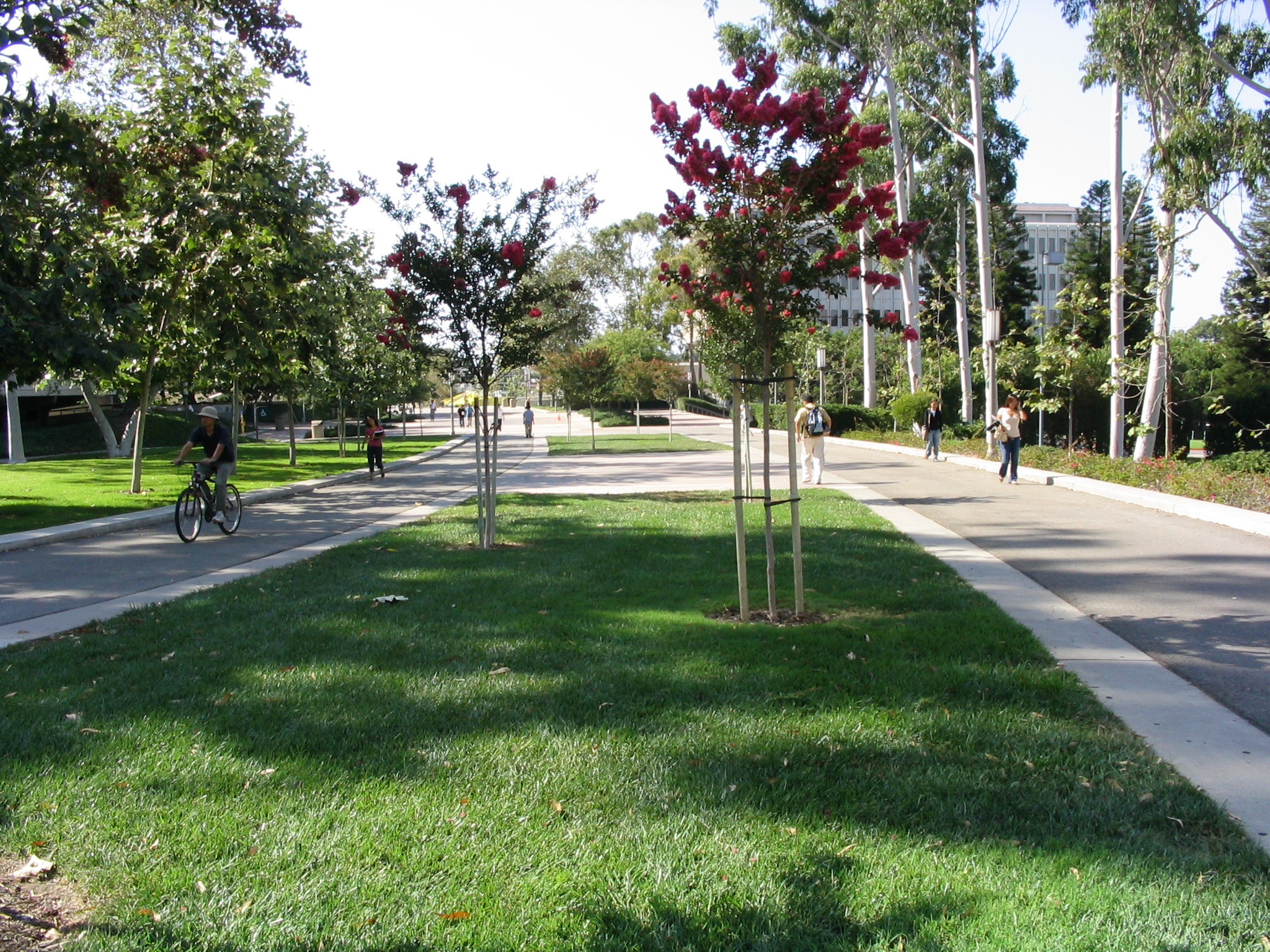
Ring Road encircles the campus as a main artery for students and other pedestrians.

UC Irvine's primary campus is entirely within Irvine, California. The campus is directly bounded by the city of Newport Beach and the community of Newport Coast to the south. The western side of the campus borders the San Joaquin Freshwater Marsh Reserve, through which drains into the Newport Back Bay saltwater estuary. The northern and eastern sides of UCI are adjacent to Irvine proper; the eastern side of the campus is delineated by Bonita Canyon Road, which turns into Culver Drive at its northern terminus and offers links to San Joaquin Hills Toll Road and Interstate 405, respectively. Additionally, UCI's southern boundary is adjacent to the San Joaquin Transportation Corridor.

There exists a "North Campus" that houses the Facilities Management Department, the Faculty Research Facility, Central Receiving, Fleet Services, the Air Pollution Health Effects Laboratory, and numerous other functions. It is located next to the UCI Arboretum; both the North Campus and the arboretum are located about 1 mile (2 km) from the main campus.

Despite the suburban environment, a variety of wildlife inhabits the university's central park, open fields, and wetlands. The university has bobcats, mountain lions, hawks, golden eagles, great blue herons, peregrine falcons, rabbits, raccoons, owls, skunks, weasels, bats, and coyotes. The small rabbits in particular are very numerous and can be seen across campus in high numbers, especially during hours of low student traffic. The UCI Arboretum hosts a collection of plants from California and Mediterranean climates around the world.

== Architecture ==
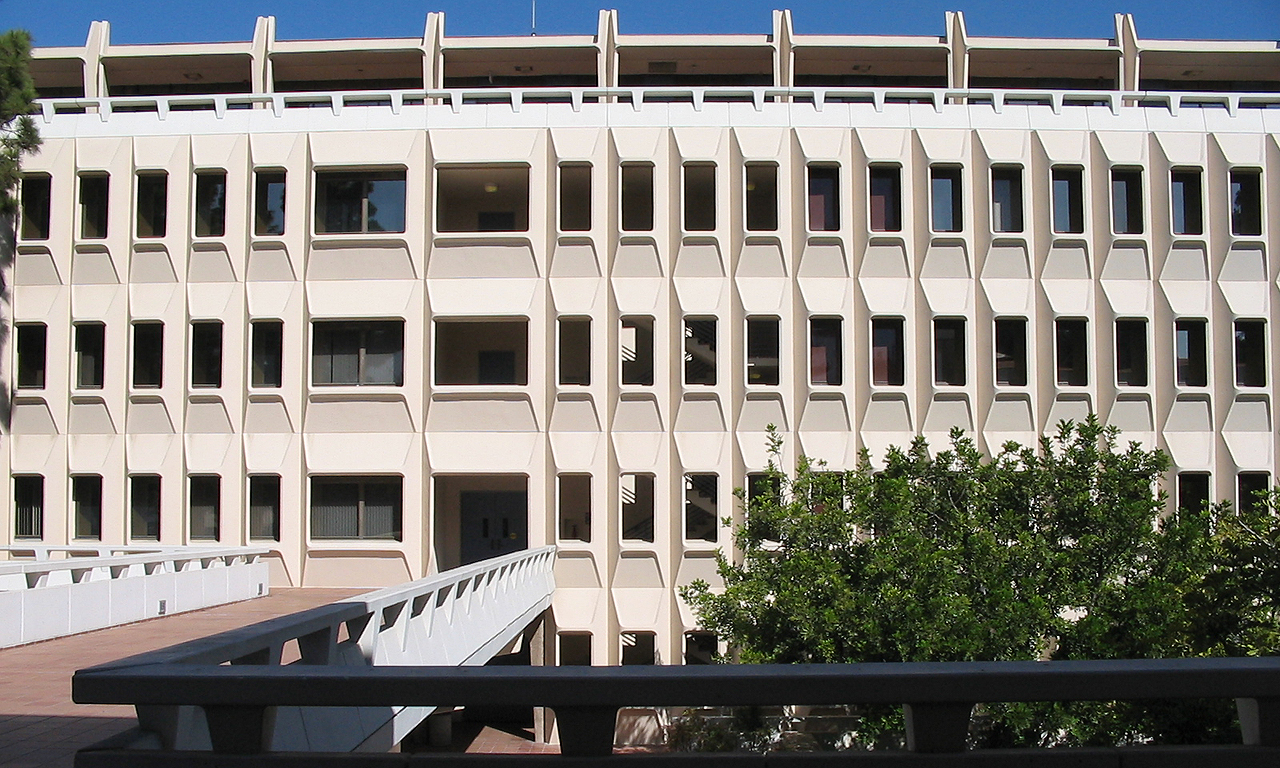
Murray Krieger Hall in the School of Humanities, named after an inspirational professor and an example of the Brutalist architecture of the campus.

The first buildings were designed by a team of architects led by William Pereira and including the partnership of A. Quincy Jones and Frederick Emmons, as well as local architects Philmer J. Ellerbroek and William Blurock, who both specialized in the design of schools. The initial landscaping including Aldrich Park was designed by an association of three firms, including urban-landscaping innovator Robert Herrick Carter and Laguna Beach-based landscape designer Frederick M. Lang. Aldrich Park was designed under the direction of landscape architect Gene Uematsu and was modeled after Frederick Law Olmsted's designs for New York City's Central Park.

The campus opened in 1965 with the inner circle and park only half-completed, with nine buildings and a dirt road connecting the main campus to the housing units. Only three of the six "spokes" that radiate from the central park were built, with only two buildings each. Pereira was retained by the university to maintain a continuity of style among the buildings constructed in the inner ring around the park, the last of which was completed in 1972. These buildings were designed in a unique style, combining sweeping curves and geometric shapes with elements of classic California architecture such as red tiled roofs and clay-tiled walkways. They sit atop raised platforms that elevate them above the rolling terrain, surrounded by heavy white railings that suggest the deck of an ocean liner. The unique paneled facades were created to shade the interiors at a time when there were no significant trees on the campus, and a color palette of warm tones was chosen to offset the frequently overcast skies.

Construction on the campus all but ceased after the Administration building, Aldrich Hall, was completed in 1974, and then resumed in the late 1980s, beginning a massive building boom that still continues today. This second building boom continued the futuristic trend, but emphasised a much more colorful, postmodern approach that somewhat contradicted the earthy, organic designs of the early buildings. Architects such as Frank Gehry and Arthur Erickson were brought in to bring the campus more "up to date". This in turn led to a "contextualist" approach beginning in the late 1990s, combining stylistic elements of the first two phases in an attempt to provide an architectural "middle ground" between the two vastly different styles. Gehry's building was recently removed from campus to make way for a new building, with a design that has been called a "big beige box with bands of bricks."

Many of the campus's Futurist buildings were featured prominently in the 1972 film Conquest of the Planet of the Apes.

As of 2005, the campus has more than 200 buildings and encompasses most of the university's 1,500 acres (6 km^{2}).

== Libraries and study centers ==
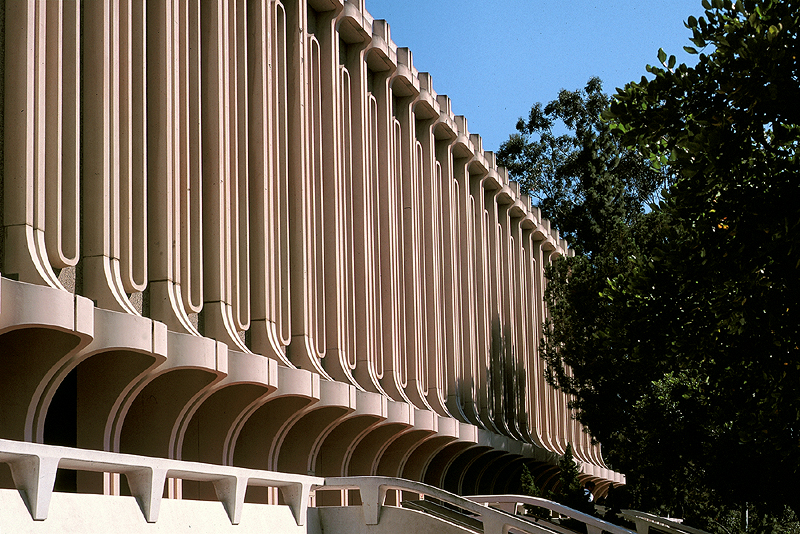
Langson Library is the main repository for most of UC Irvine's research materials and hosts many study areas. It is one of four central libraries maintained by UC Irvine.

Jack Langson Library	Resources for the Arts, Humanities, Education, Social Sciences, Social Ecology, and Business & Management disciplines
Science Library	One of the largest consolidated science and medical library in the nation. Resources for the schools of Biological Sciences, Engineering, Information and Computer Science, Physical Sciences, portions of Social Ecology, and the College of Medicine
Grunigen Medical Library	Located at UCI Medical Center, contains 43,000 volumes of material
Libraries Gateway Study Center	Located across from the Langson Library
UCI Law Library	Located on the lower two floors of the Law Building

UCI holds 4.3 million volumes, 253,000 journals and serials, and 1.9 million electronic books in its library. The library is noted for having many special collections and archives, including 100,000 government documents. In addition to holding a noted Critical Theory archive and Southeast Asian archive, the UCI Libraries also contain extensive collections in dance and performing arts, regional history, and more. Additionally, Langson Library hosts an extensive East Asian collection with materials in Chinese, Japanese, and Korean languages.

Nearly all departments and schools on campus complement the resources of the UC Irvine Libraries by maintaining their own reading rooms and scholarly meeting rooms. They contain small reference collections and are the choice for more intimate lectures, graduate seminars, and study sessions. There is also the large Gateway Study Center (across from Langson Library), one of the university's original buildings and under the custody of UC Irvine Libraries. Having served formerly as a cafeteria and student center, it is now a dual-use computer lab and study area which is open nearly 24 hours.

The UCI Student Center offers a large number of study areas, auditoriums, and a food court and therefore is one of the most popular places to study on campus. UC Irvine also has a number of computer labs that serve as study centers. The School of Humanities maintains its Humanities Instructional Resource Center, a drop-in computer lab specializing in language and digital media. Additionally, UCI maintains five other drop-in labs, four instructional computer labs, and a number of reservation-only SmartClassrooms, some of which are open 24 hours. Other popular study areas include Aldrich Park, the Cross-Cultural Center, the Locus (a study room and computer lab used by the Campuswide Honors Program), and plazas located in every School.

== Housing ==
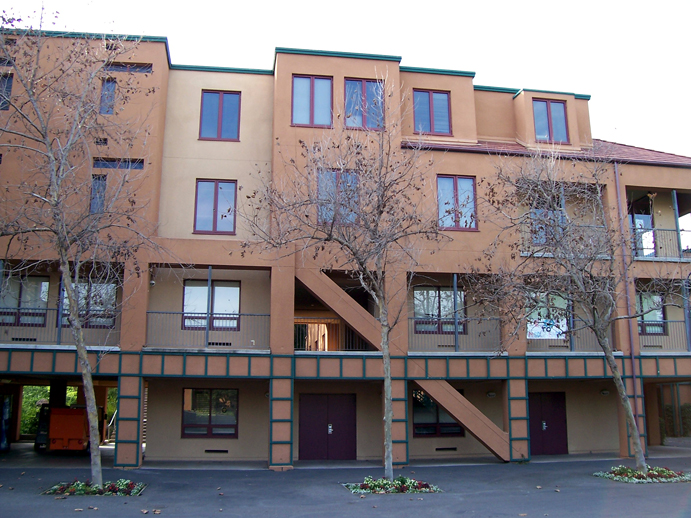
A dormitory in the undergraduate Middle Earth Housing complex. Buildings are named after places and characters from J.R.R. Tolkien's The Lord of the Rings books.

UC Irvine has a number of residential options for students interested in living on campus. Approximately 36% of UCI students are housed in university accommodations; 3,300 live in freshmen residential dormitories, approximately 4,000 other undergraduates live in apartment/theme community housing, and 1,542 living units are available for graduate students and their families. Part of UCI's long-range development plan involves expanding on-campus housing to accommodate 50% of all UCI students.

On-campus student accommodations include:

- Middle Earth Housing
- Mesa Court
- Campus Village
- Palo Verde
- Verano Place
- Arroyo Vista
- Vista del Campo (VDC)
- Vista del Campo Norte (VDCN)
- Camino del Sol
- Puerta del Sol
- Plaza Verde

On-campus faculty housing is available in the adjacent University Hills development.

Off-campus housing options vary widely, given a student's preferred living arrangements and budget. However, a common denominator for off-campus apartment housing in Irvine and nearby Newport Beach, Tustin, and Costa Mesa is the fact that most accommodations are maintained by The Irvine Company. UCI offers off-campus housing search assistance and roommate listings through its student housing office.

== Notable facilities ==
The Barclay Theatre hosts a variety of musical and performance events in a hall noted for its acoustic design. It is also home to the UCI Symphony Orchestra and plays host to prestigious guest speakers as well. For instance, two recent guests hosted by the Irvine Barclay Theater were the XIV Dalai Lama and former Soviet leader Mikhail Gorbachev.

The Claire Trevor School of the Arts hosts a number of theaters and galleries, such as the Beall Center for Art and Technology. The school is also known for its redesigned Arts Plaza, which was conceived by Maya Lin and completed in 2006. It serves as a meeting place, study area, outdoor performing arts center, exhibition hall, and lecture area.

For intimate gatherings and conferences, the Dorothy G. Sullivan University Club available due to its full-service banquet and dining amenities. It is also a popular place for students and faculty to have lunch, and its facilities may be rented out for formal events such as weddings or parties.

UC Irvine also hosts a Cross-Cultural Center (the Cross), the first of its kind in the University of California. This facility serves as a multicultural gathering area and venue for events that foster understanding between the various cultures represented on campus. Currently, the Cross-Cultural Center is undergoing a renovation and expansion effort that will double its size and offer more venues for the seven ethnic umbrella organizations and the numerous cultural clubs that operate under them.

Large-scale events make use of the Bren Events Center (the Bren), UCI's largest venue and home to many of its sporting events. It offers 22,000 square feet (2,000 m^{2}) of space and has seating for 5,500. The Bren Events Center is adjacent to the large Crawford Athletics Complex, where UCI's athletes train and compete in a recently renovated baseball park, track and field, and swimming complex.

The Anteater Recreation Center (ARC) boasts 89,000 ft (27,000 m)2 of indoor facility designed to house Campus Recreation programs. Anteater Recreation Center Fields, adjacent to the ARC, are a 25-acre (100,000 m^{2}) outdoor complex that supports Campus Recreation Field and court activities. The Sailing Facility, located on the Lower Newport Bay, is a dock spaced leased from Orange Coast College that supports UC Irvine's sailing fleet.

Much of the southern part of UCI is occupied by the University Research Park, a 158-acre (0.6 km^{2}) office and research property operated by the Irvine Company. A partial listing of tenants includes Broadcom, Blizzard Entertainment, Skyworks Solutions, Cisco, and Center for Educational Partnerships.

UCI has one of the two California Institute for Telecommunications and Information Technology (Calit2) buildings on campus. The institute's purpose is to promote "development and deployment of prototype infrastructure for testing new solutions in a real-world context" in the disciplines of nanotechnology, life sciences, information technology, and telecommunications through technology and research. The 120,000-square-foot (11,000 m^{2}) building itself features several large technology labs, a four-story atrium, and 40 seismic sensors.

UCI also had its own observatory, which was located near the University Hills faculty housing. The observatory, which was operated by the Physics Department, was open to the public during Visitor Nights that were held six times a year. The university demolished the observatory in 2014 in order to build more faculty housing. Another yet more remote facility operated by UCI is the Burns Piñon Ridge Reserve in the Mojave Desert.

Two notable public health organizations also maintain independent research facilities at UCI. The American Cancer Society has a research complex on the corner of Campus and California Drive. And recently, the Food and Drug Administration constructed a modern complex on the edge of UC Irvine's San Joaquin Freshwater Marsh Reserve. It houses the FDA Southwest Pacific Regional Laboratory and its Los Angeles District office.

== Transportation ==
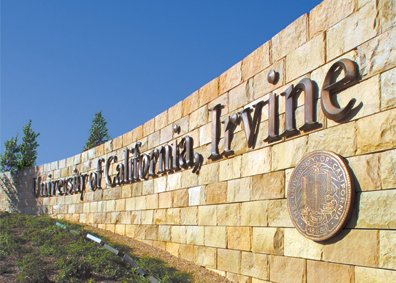
One of two identical UCI signs that face the main campus' Bison Avenue entrance

UC Irvine is served by several bus lines from OC Bus: 79 along Culver Dr, 167 along Michaelson - Jeffrey - Irvine Blvd, the 59 to Anaheim, 473 to Tustin Station, and 178 to Huntington Beach. Additionally, UC Irvine operates an internal bus service, Anteater Express, which is free for students.

== Lore ==
Many facets of the UCI main campus' design have become the subject of campus folklore. Many myths surround the theory that the campus was designed to stifle student protests because the campus was built when large-scale student protests were occurring at college campuses around the country, particularly the Free Speech Movement at UC Berkeley. Among the most popular myths are:

- A network of tunnels under the campus serves to facilitate safe evacuation of faculty and an entry point for the National Guard in the event of a protest. The tunnels actually exist but serve as conduits for HVAC and telecommunications wiring.
- The circular design of the campus was meant to provide a location (Aldrich Park) where protesters could be easily surrounded. The university believes that the genesis of the circular design came from then-UC President Clark Kerr while scribbling on a napkin.
- Recessed windows of the campus' original buildings were meant to prevent people from scaling the outside of the buildings, and to serve as hiding points for snipers. Officially, the university owes this design to the Brutalist-style architecture that the campus' original buildings were designed in. The "hoods" that cover the windows on many of these buildings were designed to keep direct sunlight from excessively heating the interiors.
