= University of California, Irvine =

Public university in Irvine, California, US

- Motto: Fiat lux (Latin)
- Motto in English: "Let there be light"
- Type: Public land-grant research university
- Established: October 4, 1965; 61 years ago
- Parent institution: University of California
- Accreditation: WSCUC
- Academic affiliations: AAU; URA; APRU; Space-grant
- Endowment: $1.028 billion (2025)
- Budget: $7.8 billion (2025)
- Chancellor: Howard Gillman
- Provost: Hal Stern
- Faculty: 7,613 (2025)
- Administrative staff: 22,883 (2025)
- Students: 37,297 (2024)
- Undergraduates: 30,204 (2024)
- Postgraduates: 7,093 (2024)
- Location: Irvine, California, United States; 33°38′44″N 117°50′33″W
- Campus: 1,582 acres (640 ha); Large Suburb
- Other campuses: Orange
- Newspaper: New University
- Colors: Blue and gold
- Nickname: Anteaters
- Sporting affiliations: NCAA Division I – Big West; MPSF
- Mascot: Peter the Anteater
- Website: uci.edu

The University of California, Irvine (UCI or UC Irvine) is a public land-grant research university in Irvine, California, United States. One of the ten campuses of the University of California system, UCI offers 87 undergraduate degrees and 129 graduate and professional degrees, and roughly 30,000 undergraduates and 7,000 graduate students were enrolled at UCI as of Fall 2024. The university is classified among "R1: Doctoral Universities – Very high research activity" and had $609.6 million in research and development expenditures in 2023, ranking it 56th nationally. UCI became a member of the Association of American Universities in 1996.

The university administers the UC Irvine Medical Center, a large teaching hospital in Orange, and its affiliated health sciences system; the University of California, Irvine, Arboretum; and a portion of the University of California Natural Reserve System. UC Irvine set up the first Earth System Science Department in the United States.

The UC Irvine Anteaters currently compete in the NCAA Division I as members of the Big West Conference. (Note: Additional sports are played in the Mountain Pacific Sports Federation and the Golden Coast Conference.)

As of 2026, alumni, academics, and affiliates of UCI include 5 Nobel Prize laureates, 7 Pulitzer Prize winners, and a Dan David Prize winner.

== History ==
=== Early years ===
The University of California, Irvine (with San Diego and Santa Cruz) was one of three new University of California campuses established in the 1960s under the California Master Plan for Higher Education. During the 1950s, the University of California saw the need for the new campuses to handle the expected increase in enrollment from the post-war baby boom. One of the new campuses was to be in the Los Angeles area; the location selected was Irvine Ranch, an area of agricultural land bisecting Orange County from north to south. This site was chosen to accommodate the county's growing population, complement the growth of nearby UCLA and UC Riverside, and allow for the construction of a master planned community in the surrounding area.

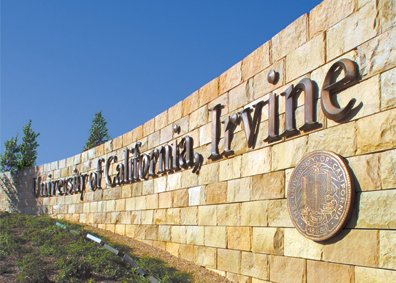
One of two identical UCI signs that face the main campus' western entrance

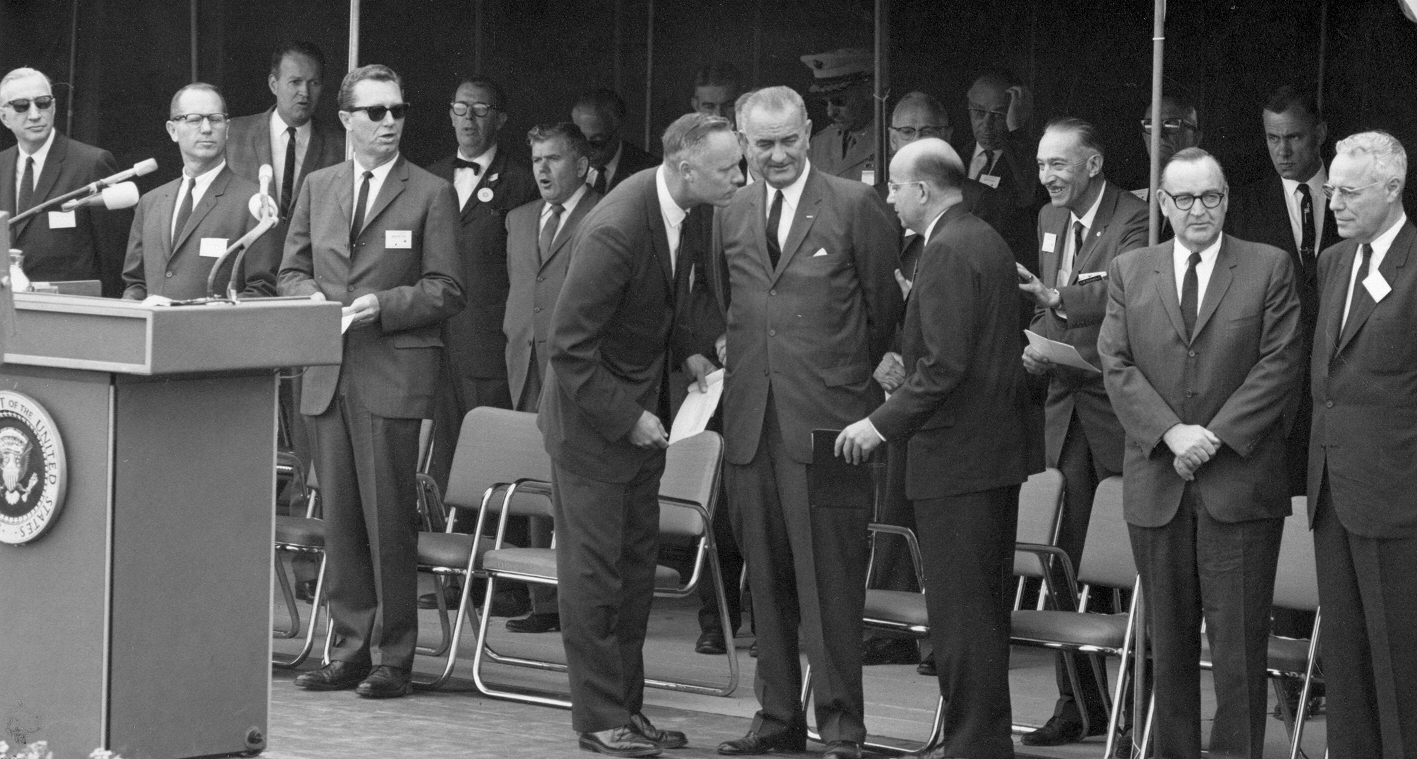
President Lyndon B. Johnson at the university's groundbreaking ceremony in June 1964

On June 20, 1964, U.S. President Lyndon B. Johnson dedicated UC Irvine before a crowd of 15,000 people, and on October 4, 1965, the campus began operations with 1,589 students, 241 staff members, 119 faculty, and 43 teaching assistants. However, many of UCI's buildings were still under construction, and landscaping was still in progress, with the campus only at 75% completion. By June 25, 1966, UCI held its first Commencement with fourteen students, which conferred ten Bachelor of Arts degrees, three Master of Arts degrees, and one Doctor of Philosophy degree.

=== Development ===
Unlike most other University of California campuses, UCI was not named for the city it was built in; at the time of the university's founding (1965), the current city of Irvine (incorporated in 1971) did not exist. The name "Irvine" is a reference to James Irvine, a landowner who administered the 94,000-acre (38,000 ha) Irvine Ranch. In 1960, The Irvine Company sold 1,000 acres (400 ha) of the Irvine Ranch to the University of California for one dollar, since company policy prohibited the donation of property to a public entity. On campus, UC Irvine's first Chancellor, Daniel G. Aldrich selected a wide variety of Mediterranean-climate flora and fauna, feeling that it served an "aesthetic, environmental, and educational [purpose]." To plan the remainder of the ranch, the university hired William Pereira and Associates. Pereira intended for the UC Irvine campus to complement the neighboring community, and it became clear that the original 1,000-acre (400 ha) grant would not suffice. In 1964, the university purchased an additional 510 acres (210 ha) in 1964 for housing and commercial developments.

Much of the land that was not purchased by UCI (which is now occupied by the cities of Irvine, Tustin, and Newport Beach) remains held by The Irvine Company, but the completion of the university rapidly drove the development of Orange County. The City of Irvine became incorporated and established in 1971 and 1975, respectively. UCI remains the second-largest employer in Orange County, employing 34,076 people as of Fall 2024 and generating an estimated $8 billion in annual economic impact in California.

Aldrich developed the campus's first academic plan around a College of Letters and Science, a Graduate School of Administration, and a School of Engineering. The "principal author" of the plan was Ivan Hinderaker, who served under Aldrich as UCI's vice-chancellor for academic affairs before departing to become the second chancellor of UC Riverside. The UCI College of Letters and Science was to be divided into five divisions which together would initially offer about a dozen majors: Biological Sciences, Fine Arts, Humanities, Physical Sciences, and Social Sciences. Hinderaker came up with the idea "to appoint deans with strong authority for each of the divisions and to give them as much freedom as possible in determining the internal organization of their divisions". In 1967, the UCI Academic Senate voted to redesignate the divisions as "schools", with all their deans reporting directly to the vice chancellor for academic affairs. This is why schools became the dominant academic unit at UCI, in contrast to the relatively large colleges at the older UC campuses.

In 1967, the California College of Medicine (originally a school of osteopathy founded in 1896 and the oldest continuously operating medical college in the Southwest) became part of UC Irvine. In 1976, plans to establish an on-campus hospital were set aside, with the university instead purchasing the Orange County Medical Center (renamed the UC Irvine Medical Center) around 12 miles from UC Irvine, in the City of Orange.

=== Recent history ===
On November 30, 2007, the Office of Civil Rights of the United States Department of Education issued a report finding insufficient evidence in support of allegations that Jewish students at UCI were harassed and subjected to a hostile environment based on their religious beliefs. The agency ultimately found that none of the incidents leading to the allegations qualified as "sufficiently severe, pervasive or persistent as to interfere with or limit the ability of an individual to participate in from the services, activities or privileges" provided by UCI, and that university officials had acted appropriately in response to each incident. In December 2007, UCI Administration was cleared of anti-semitism complaints by the US Department of Education's Office for Civil Rights. Following a speech by Chancellor Drake at the national Hillel meeting in Washington, D.C. in March 2008, Anteaters for Israel, along with three other Jewish organizations, issued a press release defending Drake and claiming that the anti-Semitic activity was "exaggerated".

==== Irvine 11 controversy ====
In 2010, eleven students from the Muslim Student Union disrupted a speech by Israeli Ambassador Michael Oren. The students and the student's union involved were first disciplined by UCI and then had criminal charges brought against them. They were convicted of misdemeanor charges and sentenced to three years probation, community service, and fines. This led to a debate on whether the students' protest was free speech and whether filing criminal charges against them was fair after UCI had already disciplined them. Critics argued that the students were victims of selective prosecution and that they were targeted because they were Muslims and supported the Palestinians.

In early July 2018, UC Irvine removed benefactor Francisco J. Ayala's name from its biology school and central science library after an internal investigation by the university's Office of Equal Opportunity and Diversity substantiated a number of sexual harassment claims. Chancellor Gillman also authorized the removal of the Ayala name from graduate fellowships, scholar programs, and endowed chairs. Ayala resigned July 1, 2018 and was ordered to abstain from future university activities, following the university's consultative procedures that include a faculty review committee. The results from the investigation were compiled in a 97-page report, which included testimony from victims of Ayala.

== Campus ==
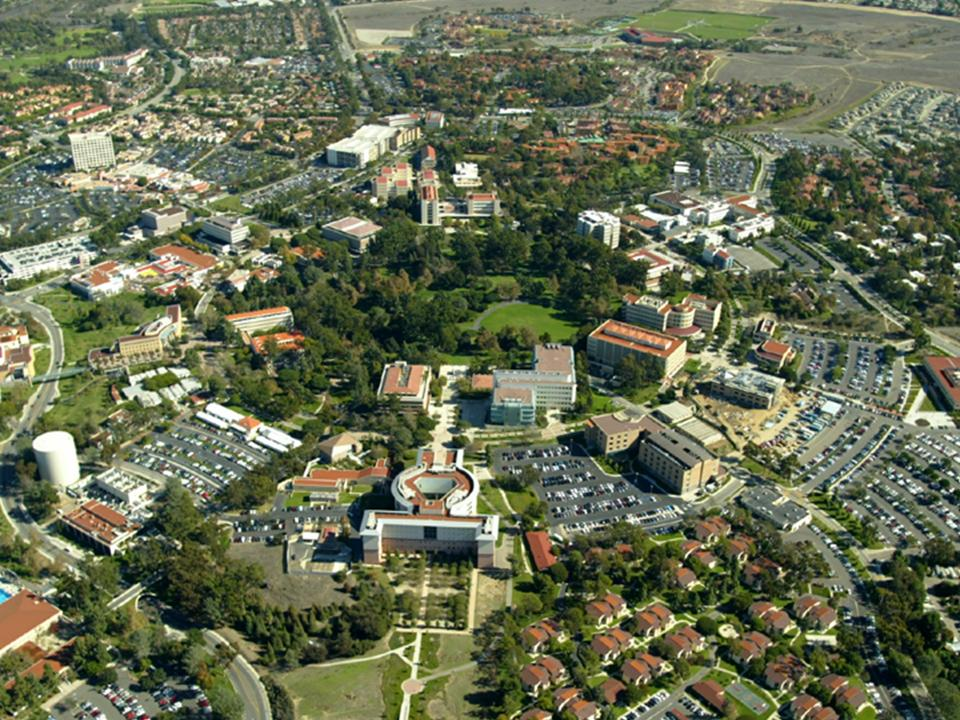
UCI's core campus and surrounding areas in 2006. Aldrich Park is in the center.

The layout of the core campus resembles a rough circle with its center being Aldrich Park (initially known as Campus Park), lined up by the Ring Mall and buildings surrounding the road. Academic units are positioned relative to the center, wherein undergraduate schools are closer to the center than the graduate schools.

Aldrich Park forms part of a campus-wide urban forest of approximately 30,000 trees.

Two ceremonial trees were planted in 1990, one for Arbor Day and the second for former chancellor Daniel Aldrich who had died that year. On the first anniversary of the September 11th tragedies, the chancellor planted a bay laurel tree in remembrance of the heroes and victims of the events of September 11, 2001. The tree itself was a gift from the UCI Staff Assembly. Reforestation and landscape revitalization efforts have shifted plantings away from earlier stands of fast-growing eucalyptus toward more native and ecologically suitable California species. The park is also reported to contain approximately 51 varieties of trees and is regarded as the first park in the City of Irvine.

=== Surroundings ===
While the university is located in Irvine, the campus is directly bounded by the city of Newport Beach and the community of Newport Coast. The western side of the campus borders the San Diego Creek and the San Joaquin Freshwater Marsh Reserve, through which Campus Drive connects UCI to the 405 freeway. The northern and eastern sides of UCI are adjacent to Irvine proper; the eastern side of the campus is delineated by Bonita Canyon Road, which turns into Culver Drive at its northern terminus. California State Route 73 marks UCI's southern boundary and separates the campus from Newport Beach.

The "North Campus" houses the Facilities Management Department, the Faculty Research Facility, Central Receiving, Fleet Services, the Air Pollution Health Effects Laboratory, and the 1.2 million square foot Irvine Campus Medical Complex (ICMC). It is located next to the UCI Arboretum, a 12.5 acre botanic garden and research facility which maintains major plant collections from the California Floristic Province and South Africa. The Arboretum is closed until further notice due to the COVID-19 pandemic with plans to relocate to the main campus. Both the North Campus and the arboretum are located about 1 mile (2 km) from the main campus. The UCI Ecological Preserve, located on the southern edge of the main campus, comprises approximately 60 acres of coastal sage scrub and grassland habitat. It is managed as part of the Nature Reserve of Orange County and is used for field instruction and ecological research. In 2024, construction of the Joe C. Wen & Family UCI Health Center for Advanced Care and the Chao Family Comprehensive Cancer Center was completed. In late 2025, an all-electric 144-bed acute care hospital will follow suit, making this the nation’s first medical center to be powered by an all-electric central utilities plant.

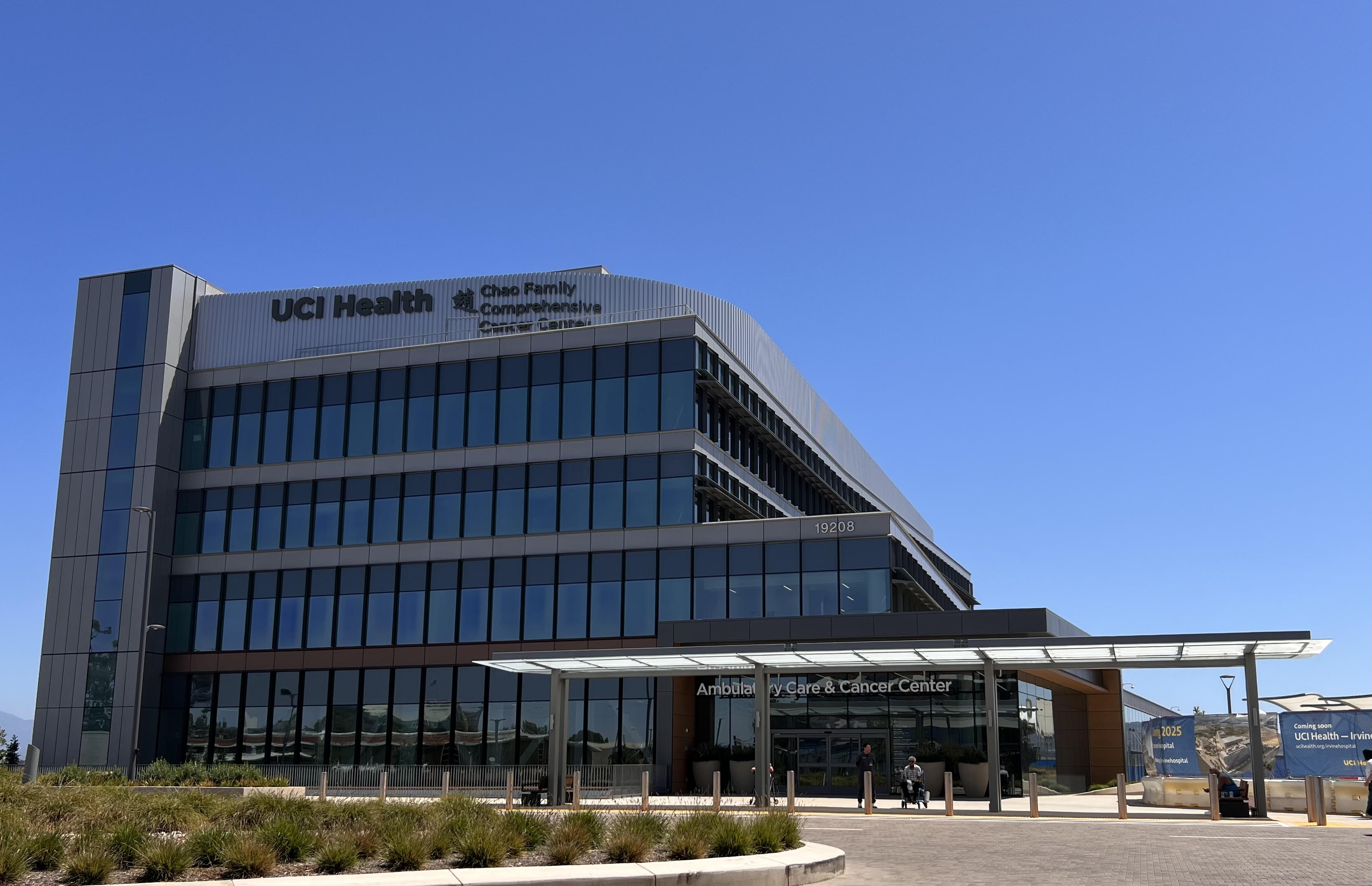
The Chao Family Comprehensive Cancer Center, in the new Irvine Campus Medical Complex.

=== Libraries and study centers ===
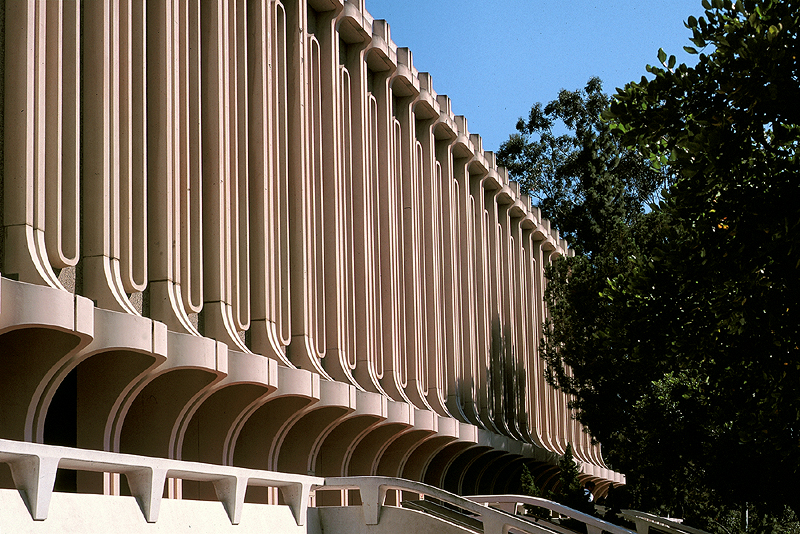
Langson Library, one of the five central libraries maintained by UCI, is the main repository for most of the university's research materials and hosts many study areas.

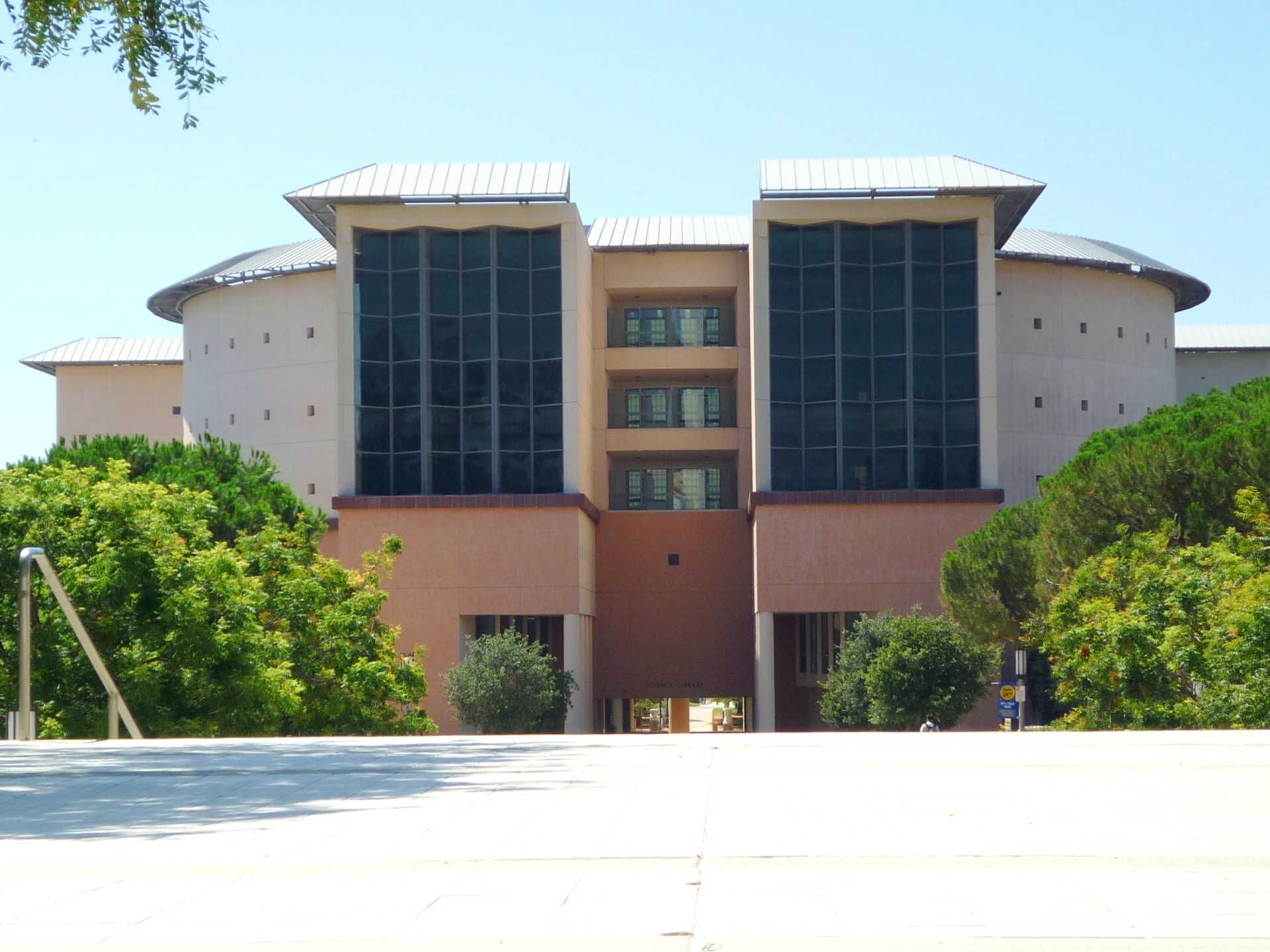
Science Library, another of the five central libraries maintained by UCI, is one of the largest consolidated science and medical libraries in the nation.

Jack Langson Library	Resources for the Arts, Humanities, Education, Social Sciences, Social Ecology, and Business & Management disciplines
Science Library	One of the largest consolidated science and medical libraries in the nation. Resources for the schools of Biological Sciences, Engineering, Information and Computer Science, Physical Sciences, portions of Social Ecology, and the College of Medicine
Grunigen Medical Library	Located at UCI Medical Center, contains 43,000 volumes of material
Law Library	Located on the bottom two floors of the Law Building

In addition to holding a noted critical theory archive and Southeast Asian archive, the Libraries also contain extensive collections in Dance and Performing Arts, Regional History, and more. Additionally, Langson Library hosts an extensive East Asian collection with materials in Chinese, Japanese, and Korean.

Nearly all departments and schools on campus complement the resources of the UC Irvine Libraries by maintaining their own reading rooms and scholarly meeting rooms. They contain small reference collections and are the choice for more intimate lectures, graduate seminars, and study sessions. There is also the large Gateway Study Center located across from Langson Library, one of the university's original buildings and under the custody of UC Irvine Libraries. Having served formerly as a cafeteria and student center, it is now a dual-use computer lab and study area which is open nearly 24 hours.

The UCI Student Center offers a large number of study areas, auditoriums, and two food courts, and therefore is one of the most popular places to study on campus. UC Irvine also has a number of computer labs that serve as study centers. The School of Humanities maintains the Humanities Instructional Resource Center, a drop-in computer lab specializing in language and digital media. Additionally, UCI maintains five other drop-in labs, four instructional computer labs, and a number of reservation-only SmartClassrooms, some of which are open 24 hours. Other popular study areas include Aldrich Park, the Cross-Cultural Center, the Locus (a study room and computer lab used by the Campuswide Honors Program), and plazas located in every school.

=== Tunnels ===
A network of tunnels runs between many of the major buildings on campus and the Central Plant, with the major trunk passage located beneath Ring Mall. Smaller tunnels branch off from this main passage to reach individual buildings, carrying electrical and air-conditioning utilities from the Central Plant. These tunnels have been the subject of much campus lore, the most popular story being that the tunnels were constructed to facilitate the safe evacuation of faculty in the event of a student riot. The main tunnel actually contains an above-ground section, in the form of the interior of an unusually thick pedestrian bridge near the Engineering Tower, in an area where the Ring Mall crosses between two hills. The tunnels are only accessible to maintenance staff, although there are also publicly accessible tunnels which intersect the utility tunnels, such as the one that goes between the main Information & Computer Science building and the Engineering Tower.

== Washington Center ==
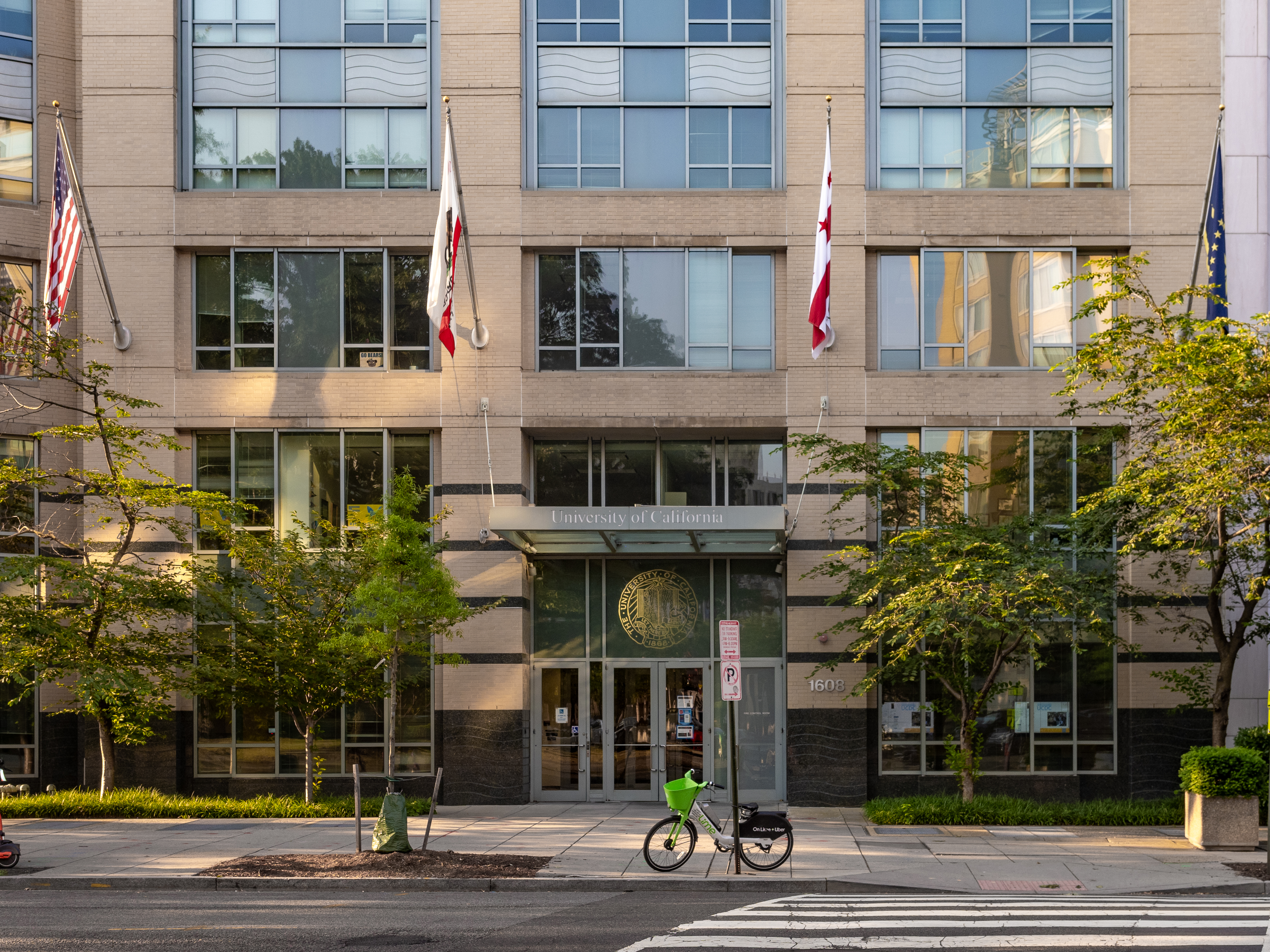
Washington Center (2024)

The University of California, Irvine, is one of nine UC undergraduate campuses that sends students to the University of California, Washington DC (UCDC) program. This is a UC systemwide program housed in the University of California Washington Center, located on Scott Circle in Downtown Washington ( 38°54′23.4″N 77°2′14″W). The center serves as the headquarters of the University of California Office of Federal Governmental Relations and supports UC students interning in the District of Columbia. UC Washington Center is currently led by UC Merced sociology professor, Tanya Golash-Boza.

== Governance ==
Like other University of California campuses, UC Irvine operates under a system of shared governance, or a partnership between the Chancellor and his administration and the faculty through the Academic Senate. The Chancellor is the chief campus officer and has authority over the campus budget. The Academic Senate has authority to determine the conditions for admission and supervise courses and curricula. The Chancellor is nominated by and is responsible to the Regents of the University of California and the UC President.

After the Chancellor, the second most senior official is the Executive Vice Chancellor and Provost, the university's chief academic and operating officer. Every school on campus reports to the Executive Vice Chancellor and Provost through a Dean, and all other academic and administrative units report to this office through a Vice Chancellor or chief administrator. A partial list of these units includes Campus Recreation, Intercollegiate Athletics, Planning and Budget, Student Affairs, UC Irvine Libraries, UC Irvine Medical Center, and University Advancement.

== Academics ==
=== Academic units ===
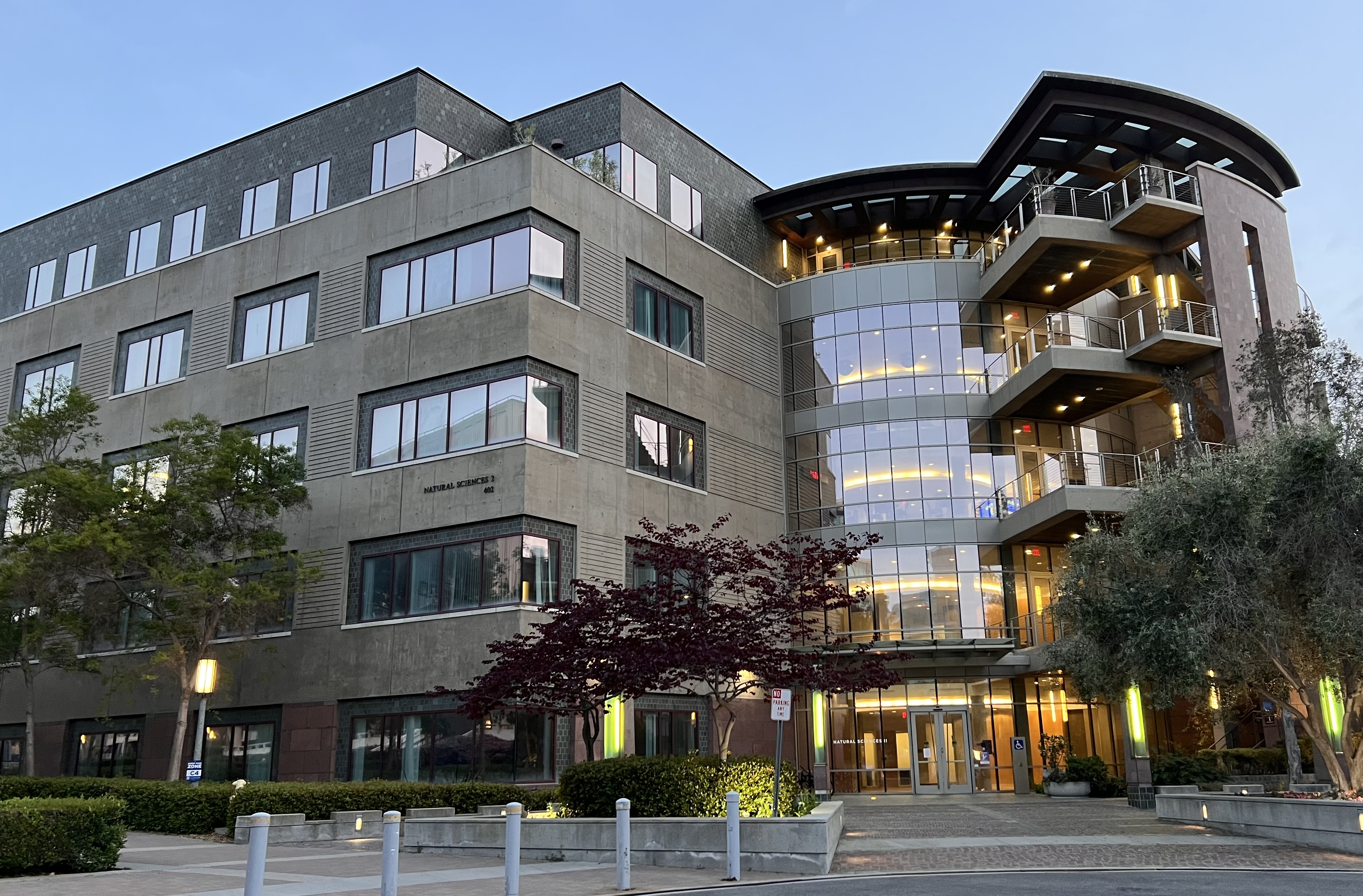
Natural Sciences II, Charlie Dunlop School of Biological Sciences

Social Science Tower and Social Science Lab from Aldrich Park.

UC Irvine's academic units are referred to as schools. As of the 2023–2024 school year, there were fifteen schools and several interdisciplinary programs. The College of Health Sciences was established in 2004, but no longer exists as a separate academic unit. On November 16, 2006, the University of California Regents approved the establishment of the School of Law. The School of Education was established by the UC Regents in 2012. In 2016, the university announced that it had received a $40 million donation from Bill Gross' philanthropic foundation to turn its nursing science program into the Sue and Bill Gross School of Nursing. The UC Regents formally approved the establishment of the school in January 2017. In July 2020, the UC Regents approved the establishment of the School of Pharmacy and Pharmaceutical Sciences. In July 2024, UCI received a gift of $50 million to support the transition of the former Program in Public Health to the Joe C. Wen School of Population and Public Health, named for the donor and his family. Supplementary education programs offer accelerated or community education in the form of Summer Session and UC Irvine Extension.

The academic units consist of (with their founding in parentheses):

- Claire Trevor School of the Arts (1970)
- Charlie Dunlop School of Biological Sciences (1965)
- Paul Merage School of Business (1965)
- School of Education (1967)
- Henry Samueli School of Engineering (1965)
- School of Humanities (1965)
- Donald Bren School of Information & Computer Sciences (2002)
- Interdisciplinary Studies (1992)
- School of Law (2007)
- School of Physical Sciences (1965)
- School of Social Ecology (1970)
- School of Social Sciences (1965)
- School of Medicine (1896)
- Sue & Bill Gross School of Nursing (2007)
- School of Pharmacy & Pharmaceutical Sciences (2020)
- Joe C. Wen School of Population and Public Health (2024)

=== Health care ===
The School of Medicine constitutes the professional schools of health science. The UC Irvine Medical Center is ranked among the nation's top 50 hospitals by U.S. News & World Report for the 12th consecutive year. The school has 19 clinical and 6 basic science departments with 560 full-time and 1,300 volunteer faculty members involved in teaching, patient care, and medical and basic science research. With an acceptance rate of 3.98% for 6,929 applicants in 2025, it is among the nation's 20 most selective medical schools.

UC Irvine's Medical Center and Education Building.

=== Research organizations ===
UCI's many research organizations are either chaired by or composed of UCI faculty, frequently draw upon undergraduates and graduates for research assistance, and produce innovations, patents, and scholarly works. Some are housed in a school or department office; others are housed in their own facilities. These are a few of the research organizations at UCI:

- Atmospheric Integrated Research at UCI (AirUCI)
- Beckman Laser Institute
- Brunson Center for Translational Vision Research (CTVR)
- California Institute for Telecommunications and Information Technology (Calit2)
- Center for Chemistry at the Space-Time Limit (CaSTL Center)
- Center for Complex Biological Systems (CCBS)
- Center for Embedded and Cyber-physical Systems (CECS)
- Center for Global Peace and Conflict Studies (CGPACS)
- Center for Cognitive Neuroscience and Engineering (CENCE)
- Center for Virus Research (CVR)
- Connected Learning Lab (CLL)
- Eddleman Quantum Institute
- Chao Family Comprehensive Cancer Center
- Institute of Transportation Studies (ITS)
- Institute for Memory Impairments and Neurological Disorders (UCI MIND)
- National Fuel Cell Research Center
- The Fleischman Lab
- Reeve-Irvine Research Center
- Jack W. Peltason Center for the Study of Democracy
- Center for Health Care Management and Policy
- Sue and Bill Gross Stem Cell Research Center
- Institute for Genomics and Bioinformatics (IGB)
- Center for Machine Learning and Data Mining (CML)
- University of California Transportation Center (UCTC)

=== Rankings ===
Academic rankings

National
- Forbes: 37
- U.S. News & World Report: 34 (tie)
- Washington Monthly: 101
- WSJ/College Pulse: 31

Global
- ARWU: 79
- QS: 252
- THE: 97
- U.S. News & World Report: 99

National Program Rankings
Program	Ranking
Biological Sciences	32
Business	43
Part-time MBA	23
Chemistry	24
Computer Science	27
Criminology	2
Earth Sciences	27
Economics	41
English	21
Education	18
Engineering	37
Fine Arts	42
Geometry	16
History	42
Law	38
Pharmacy	60
Physics	35
Political Science	41
Psychology	27
Public Health	27
Sociology	20
Statistics	27
Mathematics	34
Medicine: Primary Care	Tier 3
Medicine: Research	Tier 2
Nursing: Master's	47

Global Subject Rankings
Program	Ranking
Arts & Humanities	61
Biology & Biochemistry	173
Cell Biology	97
Chemistry	108
Clinical Medicine	195
Computer Science	116
Condensed Matter Physics	139
Ecology	223
Economics & Business	215
Education and Educational Research	34
Electrical & Electronic Engineering	199
Endocrinology & Metabolism	171
Energy & Fuels	268
Engineering	214
Environment/Ecology	113
Geosciences	14
Immunology	160
Infectious Diseases	142
Materials Science	124
Mathematics	160
Meteorology and Atmospheric Sciences	10
Microbiology	144
Molecular Biology & Genetics	121
Nanoscience & Nanotechnology	172
Neuroscience & Behavior	47
Oncology	99
Optics	249
Pharmacology & Toxicology	127
Physical Chemistry	112
Physics	212
Psychiatry/Psychology	57
Public, Environmental & Occupational Health	247
Radiology, Nuclear Medicine & Medical Imaging	83
Social Sciences & Public Health	137
Space Science	127
Surgery	175

==== Global ====
Top 10 foreign countries in headcount (Fall 2025)
Country	Headcount
China	3,016
India	345
South Korea	334
Taiwan	176
Vietnam	108
Canada	104
Iran	96
United Kingdom	84
Indonesia	60
Japan	46

In 2025, THE ranked UCI's Psychology program 42nd, their law school 66th, and Computer Science program as 75th globally. Nationally, the university was 35th overall.

==== National ====
For 2027, U.S. News & World Report ranked UC Irvine tied for 34th among national universities in the U.S., tied for 8th among public universities, tied for 11th in "Top Performers on Social Mobility", tied for 50th in "Most Innovative Schools", tied for 42nd in "Best Undergraduate Engineering Programs", tied for 28th in "Computer Science", and tied for 31st in "Business Programs". In 2019, Forbes ranked UCI 3rd out of the 300 Best Value Colleges, based on Return on Investment. In 2017, Kiplinger ranked UCI 26th out of the top 100 best-value public colleges and universities in the nation, and 5th in California. In 2018, Sierra Magazine ranked UCI 1st in its "Coolest Schools" in America list for campus sustainability and climate change efforts. In 2021, it was ranked 2nd, marking the 12th time in a row it had placed in the top 10. In 2024, The Princeton Review ranked UCI 5th among public universities by return on investment (ROI) in its Best Value Colleges list. It also ranked 13th in ROI among public schools for students that do not qualify for financial aid.

Washington Monthly's 2025 Best Colleges For Research ranked UCI 34th out of 139 institutions, based on total research spending, science and engineering PhDs awarded, faculty receiving major national awards, and the share of faculty elected to the National Academies of Sciences, Engineering, and Medicine.

In the 2025 Carnegie Classifications, UCI was designated both a "Research 1" university and an "Opportunity College and University", making it one of 21 institutions in the US, and the only member of the Association of American Universities in California to hold both designations.

For 2025-26, Niche, whose ranking methodology combines both student experiential reviews with objective metrics supplied from third-party institutions, ranked UCI 63rd nationally amongst colleges (including LACs) and 18th amongst public universities. It ranked UCI in the top 50 nationally for Criminal Justice (6), Public Health (15), Film and Photography (27), Performing Arts (24), Music (28), Psychology (30), Computer Science (39), Education (33), Anthropology and Sociology (37), Physics (48), Math (39), Engineering (39), Chemistry (40), Biology (46), International Relations (47), and Philosophy (49).

In addition, many of UCI's graduate programs are ranked in the top 50 of the 2025 U.S. News & World Report rankings: Criminology (2), Organic Chemistry (14), English (21), Chemistry (24), Sociology (20), Computer Science (27), Public Health (27), Physics (35), Psychology (27), Law (38), Statistics (27), Education (18), Biological Sciences (32), Earth Sciences (27), History (42), Engineering (37), Business Part-Time MBA (23), Political Science (41), Mathematics (34), and Economics (41).

==== Learned societies affiliations ====
UCI faculty are affiliated with the following learned societies.

- American Academy of Arts and Sciences (47 members)
- American Association for the Advancement of Science (154 members)
- American Philosophical Society (11 members)
- American Physical Society (30 members)
- Howard Hughes Medical Institute (3 members)
- American Psychological Association (20 members)
- National Academy of Medicine (6 members)
- National Academy of Engineering (11 members)
- National Academy of Sciences (34 members)
- National Academy of Education (5 members)
- National Academy of Inventors (20 members)

=== Admissions ===
==== Undergraduate ====
Undergraduate admission statistics
	Fall 2025	Fall 2024	Fall 2023	Fall 2022	Fall 2021
First-time Freshmen
Applicants	124,223	122,699	121,101	119,194	107,743
Admits	35,658	35,045	30,956	25,208	31,109
Admit rate	29%	29%	26%	21%	29%
Enrolled	6,423	6,736	6,796	5,664	6,489
Yield rate	18%	19%	22%	22%	21%
Transfers
Applicants	25,386	25,104	21,992	22,815	25,857
Admits	9,879	9,884	9,438	9,142	9,674
Admit rate	39%	39%	43%	40%	37%
Enrolled	2,797	2,719	2,871	2,579	2,863
Yield rate	28%	28%	30%	28%	30%

UC Irvine is categorized by U.S. News & World Report as "most selective" for college admissions in the United States. It was the third-most selective University of California campus for the freshman class entering in the fall of 2019, as measured by the ratio of admitted students to applicants (behind UC Berkeley and UCLA). UC Irvine received 124,231 applications for admission to the fall 2025 incoming freshman class and 35,964 were admitted, making UC Irvine's acceptance rate 28.94% for fall 2025. The first-year median weighted GPA was 4.19 for fall 2025.

The incoming 2025 freshmen were predominantly from Orange County (25.7%), followed by Los Angeles County (25.3%), San Diego County (7.3%), Riverside County (7.0%), and San Bernardino County (5.4%). Of the 2025 freshmen international students, a majority came from Asia. 67.0% were from China, 6.1% from India, 5.6% from South Korea, 4.0% from Taiwan, and a distant 1.9% from Canada.

Admission and yield rates also vary by the residency of applicants. For Fall 2025, California residents had a selectivity rate of 21.9% out of 86,230 applicants, with a yield rate of 25.7%. Out of state residents saw greater rate of admission, with 47.5% of 16,381 applicants receiving acceptance. However, only 5.8% of those admitted went on to enroll. Of the 21,620 international students who applied, 42.8% were accepted and 11.9% went on to enroll.

That year, the most popular major for freshmen (excluding transfers) was Undeclared (15.4%), followed by Biological Sciences (12.8%), Business Administration (4.0%), Computer Science (3.9%), Public Health Sciences (3.7%), and Political Science (3.3%).

The choice to offer admission is based on the University of California's comprehensive review program, which considers a candidate's personal situation, community involvement, extracurricular activities, and academic potential in addition to the traditional high school academic record, personal statement, and entrance examination scores. While residency is not a factor in admission, it is a factor in tuition expenses, with out-of-state residents fees much greater than California residents. Since the approval of Proposition 209 in November 1996, California state law has prohibited all public universities (including UC Irvine) from practicing affirmative action as part of their admissions processes.

==== Graduate ====
In Fall 2025, The School of Law enrolled 189 out of 3,720 applicants for an enrolling class that has a median LSAT score of 169 (166-170 interquartile range), and median GPA of 3.80 (interquartile range 3.59-3.90). In Fall of 2024, the acceptance rate was 17.38%. The School of Medicine admitted 273 of 6,929 applicants for the 2024-25 academic year for an admission rate of 3.98%, placing it among the nation's 20 most selective medical schools. Of the 273 admitted students, 114 matriculated, with an observed median GPA of 3.94 and median MCAT score of 516 among the 2024 MS1 (first-year) class.

== Discoveries and innovation ==
=== Machine Learning Repository ===
The University of California Irvine hosts the UCI Machine Learning Repository, a data resource which is very popular among machine learning researchers and data mining practitioners. It was created in 1987 and contains 682 datasets as of October 2025 from several domains including biology, medicine, physics, engineering, social sciences, games, and others. The datasets contained in the UC Irvine Machine Learning Repository have been used by thousands of students and researchers in the computer science community and facilitated the publication of approximately 26 thousand scientific articles.

== Student life ==
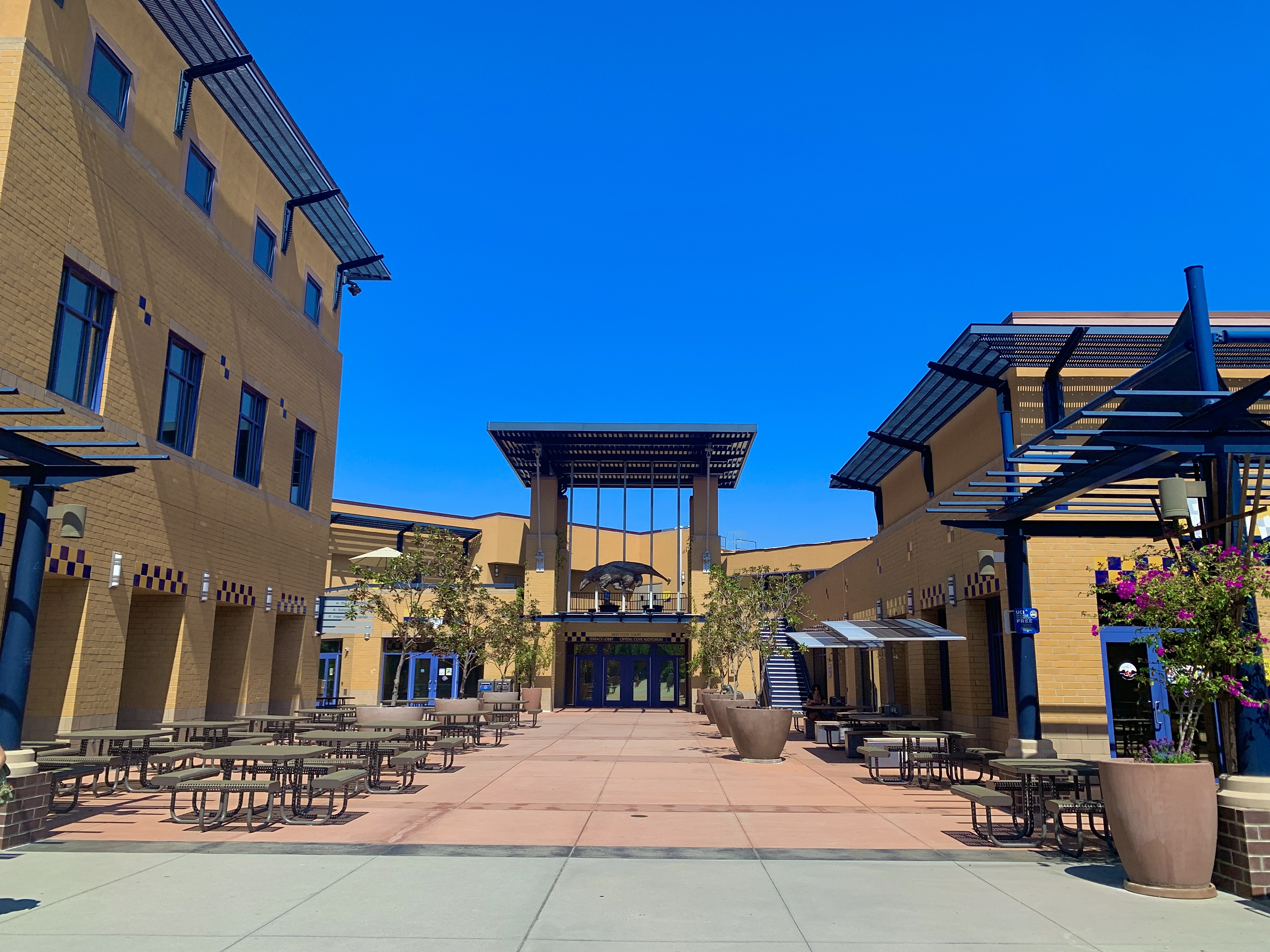
The Student Center

Undergraduate demographics as of Fall 2023
Race and ethnicity	Total
Asian	39%
Hispanic	26%
White	13%
Foreign national	12%
Two or more races	6%
Black	2%
Unknown	2%
Economic diversity
Low-income (Note: The percentage of students who received an income-based federal Pell grant intended for low-income students.)	38%
Affluent (Note: The percentage of students who are a part of the American middle class at the bare minimum.)	62%

=== Fraternities and sororities ===
The first fraternities and sororities at UCI began in 1973 with three sororities and three fraternities.

=== Clubs and organizations ===
There are around 600 student clubs and organizations on campus. Campus activities throughout the year include cultural nights, arts performances, and live music at Anteater Plaza. Special events such as Aldrich Park After Dark, Summerlands, Soulstice, and Earth Day are held yearly. ASUCI, the university's undergraduate student government, traditionally organizes a world record attempt by the university at the beginning of each academic year. UCI has won Guinness World Records for the largest game of capture the flag six times, with the most recent one in September 2015. In addition, the university has broken the record for the largest game of dodgeball three years straight. They have also won records for largest water pistol fight and largest pillow fight.

== On campus housing ==
As of 2024, UCI houses approximately 17,878 students or about 50% of the campus enrollment.

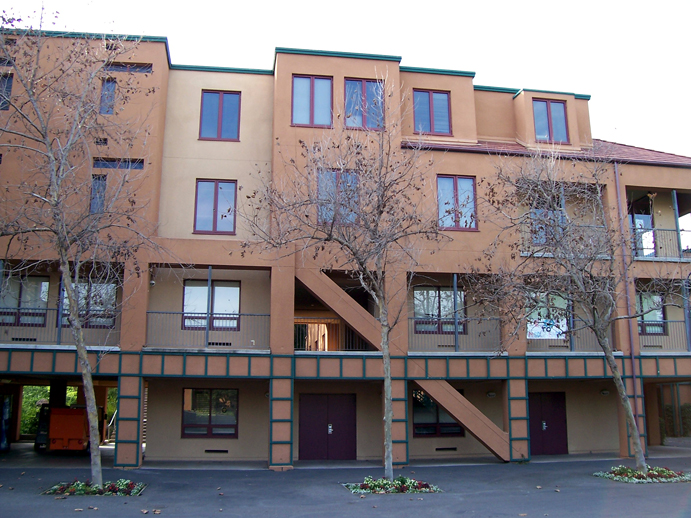
Residence Halls at the Middle Earth undergraduate housing complex (for freshmen) are named after places and characters from J. R. R. Tolkien's The Lord of the Rings book series.

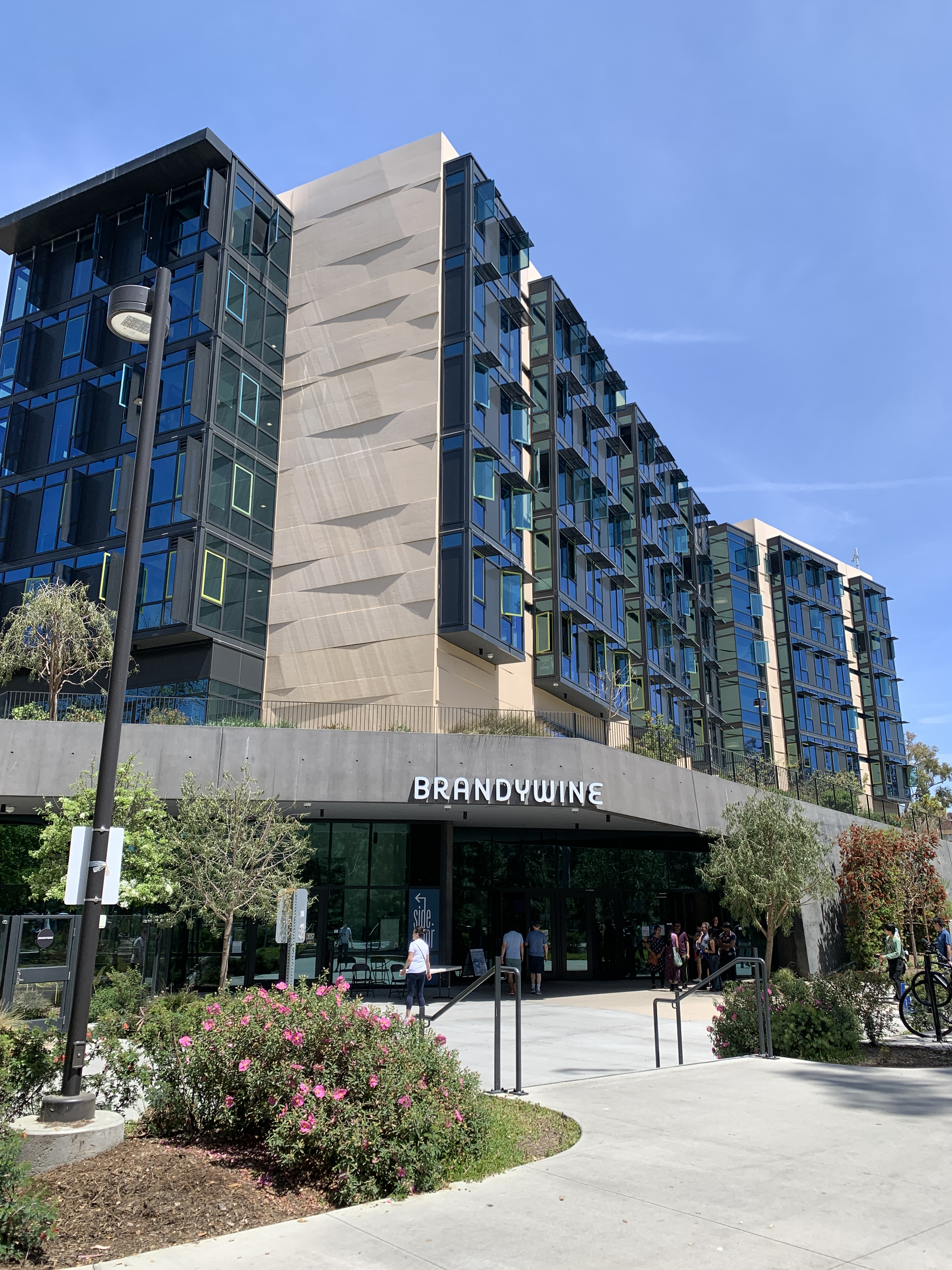
Brandywine Dining Hall, situated beneath the Middle Earth Towers.

=== Middle Earth ===
Middle Earth is a student housing complex that includes housing approximately 1,784 first-year students in 24 "classics" residence halls, and another 640 in two five-level "towers", a student center (Pippin Center), dining facility (Brandywine) and several resource centers. Each hall houses 48–96 students, although Quenya was built with sixty single-suite rooms originally intended for graduate students. The names of the halls and other facilities were selected from J.R.R. Tolkien's legendarium.

Middle Earth is located along Ring Road, toward the core of the university's campus. The residence halls were built in three consecutive phases, beginning in 1974. The first phase was designed by William Pereira. The first phase included seven halls: Hobbiton, Isengard, Lorien, Mirkwood, Misty Mountain, Rivendell, and the Shire, along with a separate Head Resident's manufactured home called "Bag End". The second phase was built in 1989 with thirteen more halls: Balin, Harrowdale, Whispering Wood, Woodhall, Calmindon, Grey Havens, Aldor, Rohan, Gondolin, Snowbourn, Elrond, Shadowfax, and Quenya. The third phase was built in 2000 with four halls: Crickhollow, Evenstar, Oakenshield, and Valimar. The last phase was completed in the summer of 2019 and officially opened September 16, 2019; although reported in the media as being called the two towers of Middle Earth, its two buildings are actually named Telperion and Laurelin, after the Two Trees of Valinor. These towers house around 640 undergraduate students.

=== Mesa Court ===
Mesa Court is another housing community intended for freshman as part of the "First Year Experience". It houses around 3,484 students in 29 "classics" halls and four residential towers. The towers themselves accommodate 1,440 students and include study areas, computer labs, a fitness center, with shared kitchenettes and laundry facilities. Situated below "Caballo", one of the towers, is the other major dining facility on campus (The Anteatery) which can serve 780 students at maximum. The most recent addition, Oso Tower, was completed in 2025 and began accommodating around 400 residents for the 2025-26 school year.

Mesa Court is situated closer to the northern edge of campus and is fed via pedestrian bridges from the Student Center and the School of Humanities making it less connected to the core campus than Middle Earth. Located in close proximity are the Claire Trevor School of the Arts and the Bren Events Center.

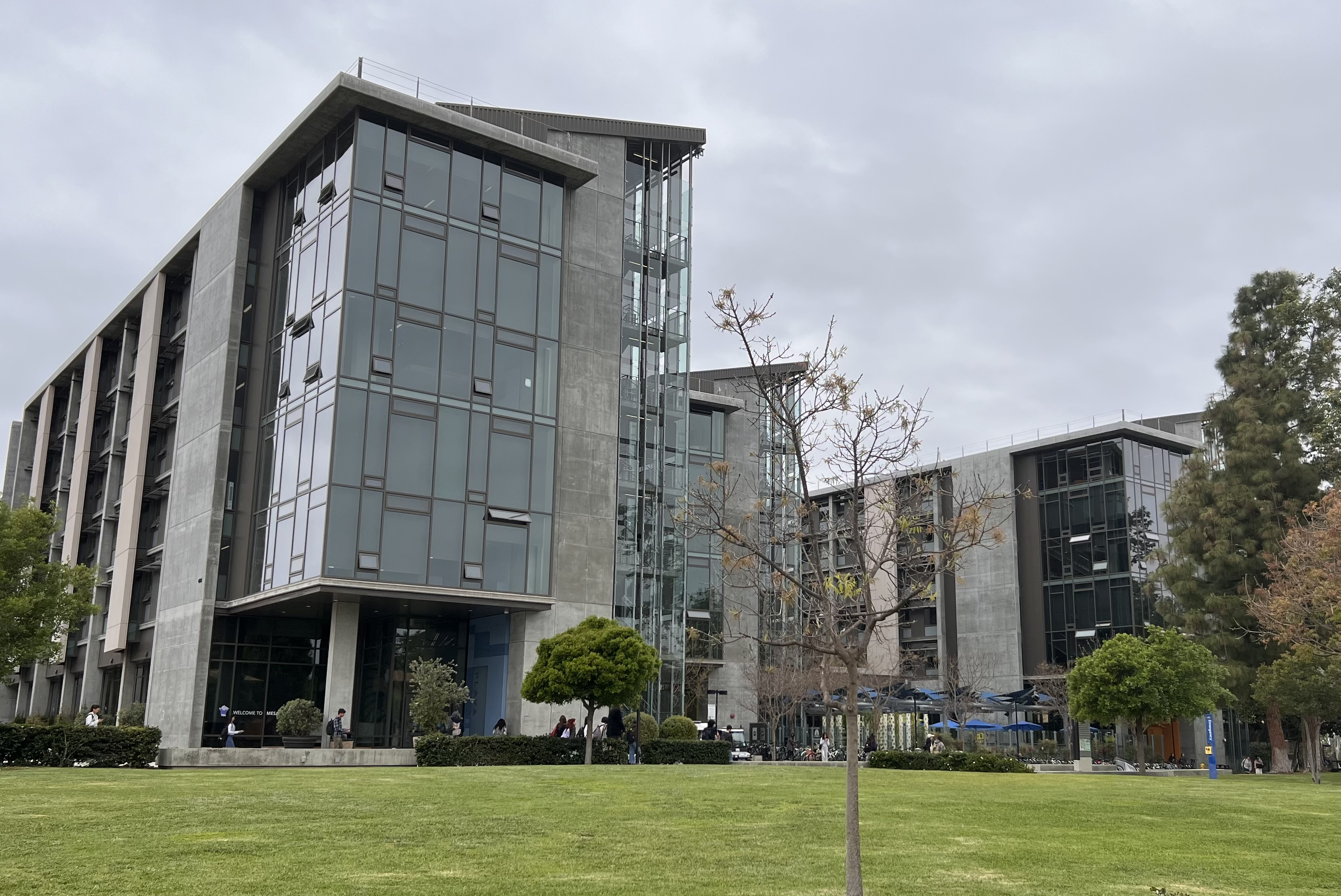
Mesa Court Towers

=== Graduate Housing ===
Full-time graduate students are guaranteed on-campus housing for the duration of a determined "normal time to degree" for their program, and as long as they maintain good academic standing. They are accommodated in either the Palo Verde, Verano Place, Campus Village, or ACC apartments.

==== Verano Place ====
The Verano Place apartments first began housing graduate students in 1966, not long after the founding of the university. Subsequent development has supplemented the original residence halls with higher-density housing for a predominantly medical, law, and graduate student population of about 2,095.

In summer of 2022, the Verano 8 Graduate Student Housing Community was completed, adding 1,055 beds across five seven-story buildings to help alleviate the demand of a growing graduate population. Included in the housing community is a community center and an 853-stall parking garage.

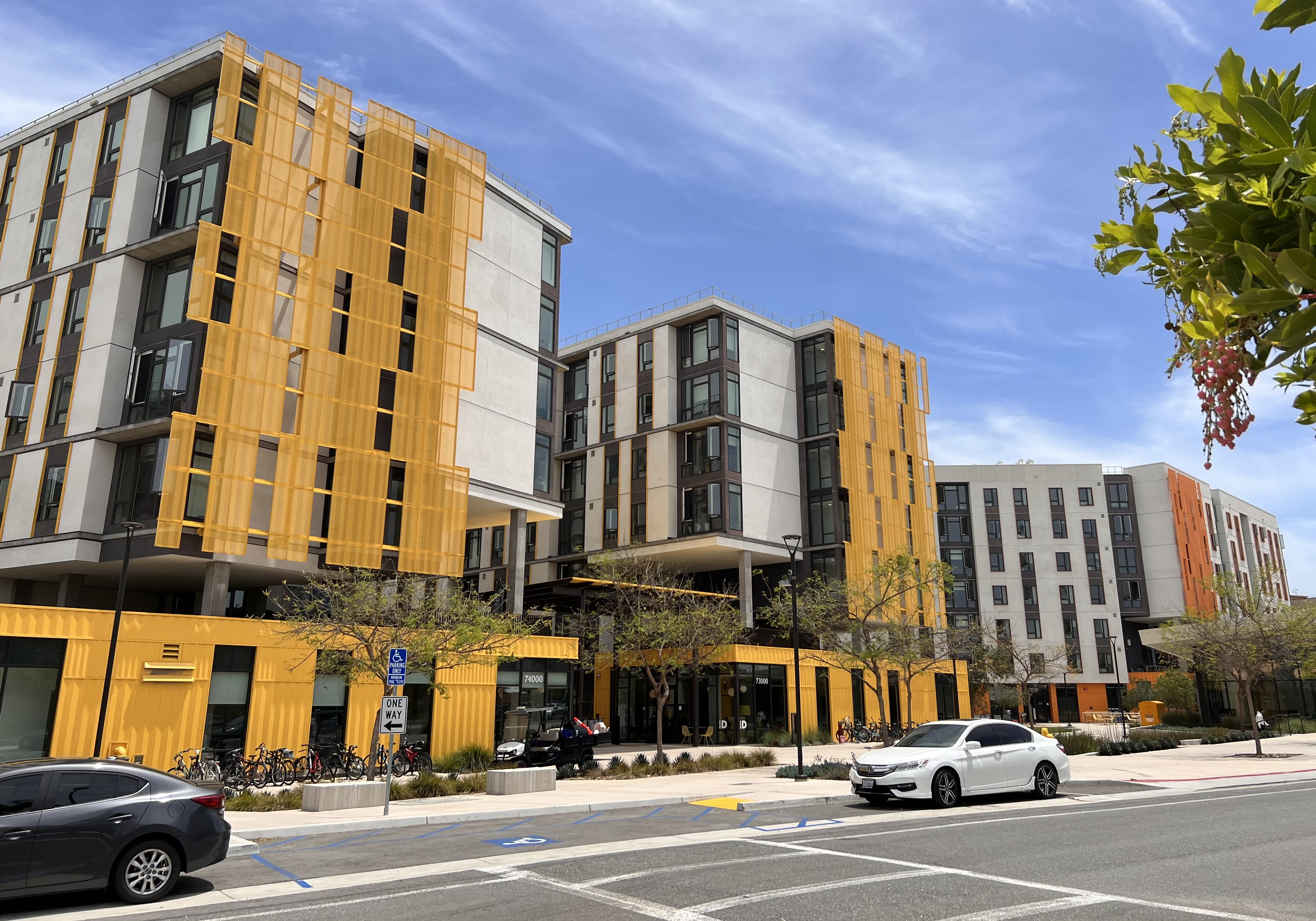

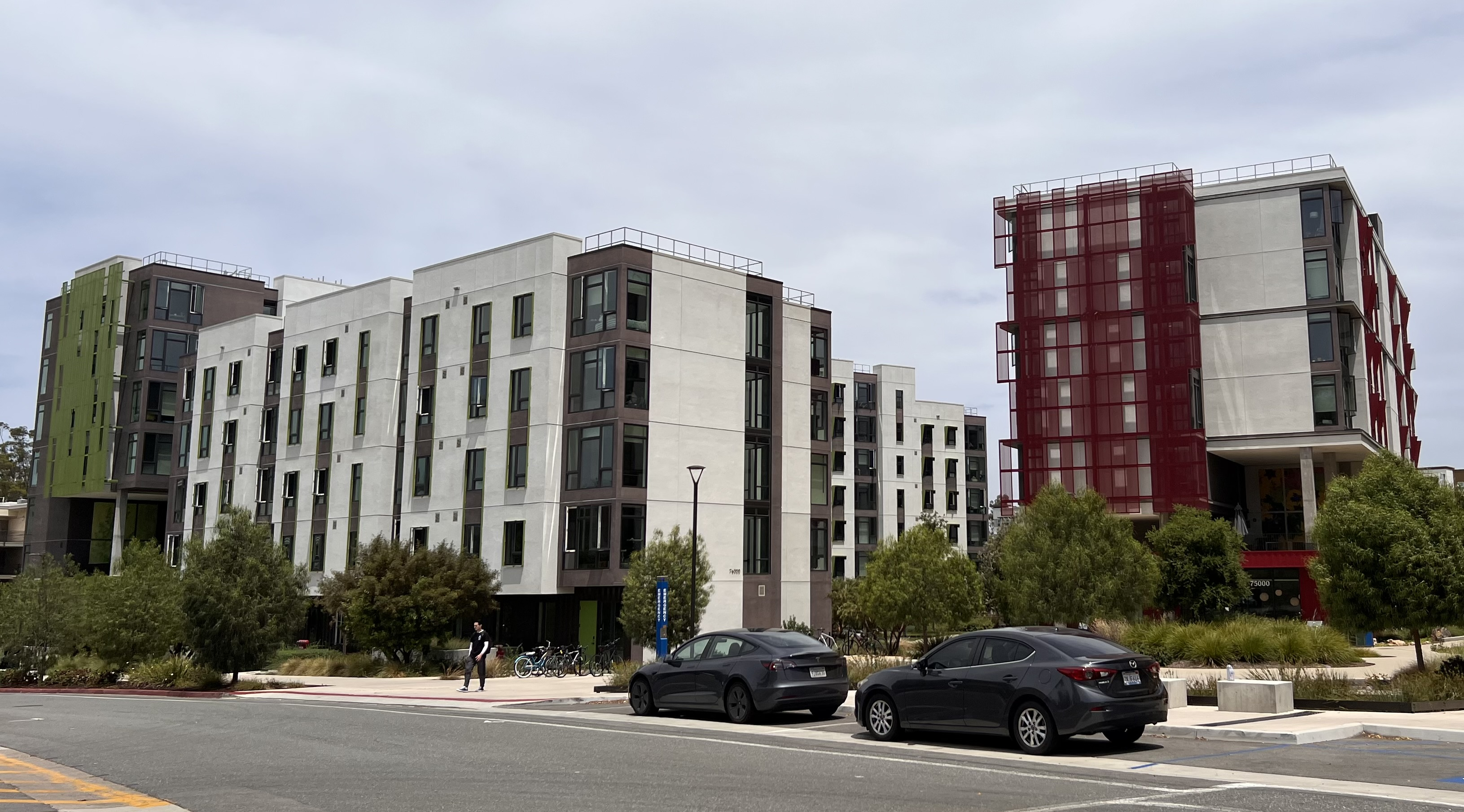
The Verano 8 residential community consists of five seven-story buildings.

== Athletics ==
UC Irvine Anteaters logo

UC Irvine's sports teams are known as the Anteaters and the student body is known as Antourage. They currently participate in the NCAA's Division I, as members of the Big West Conference and the Mountain Pacific Sports Federation. In the early years of the school's existence, the teams participated at the NCAA Division II level with great success as explained in the UC Irvine Anteaters page. UC Irvine fields nationally competitive teams in baseball, basketball, cross country, golf, soccer, track and field, volleyball and water polo. The university has won 28 national championships in nine different sports, and fielded 64 individual national champions, 53 Olympians and over 500 All-Americans.

The university's most recent NCAA Division I national championship was won by the men's volleyball team in 2013. UC Irvine men's volleyball won four national championships in 2007, 2009, 2012 and 2013.

UC Irvine won three NCAA Division I men's water polo titles, with championships in 1970, 1982 and 1989.

UC Irvine Anteaters baseball won back-to-back national championships at the NCAA College Division College World Series and the NCAA Division II College World Series in 1973 and 1974. Anteater baseball moved to the NCAA Division I level. The 2007 baseball team finished 3rd at the College World Series, and in 2009 the baseball team earned a No. 1 national ranking in NCAA Division I polls from Baseball America and Collegiate Baseball for the first time, as well as a national seed and the right to host an NCAA Regional. The 2014 baseball team returned to the College World Series and finished 5th.

UCI Anteater's golf team won the NCAA Division II national team championship in 1975 with team member Jerry Wisz winning the individual title. At the NCAA national championships in 1973, 1974 and 1976, those teams finished second twice and fourth the other year. These teams included seven All-Americans.

In 2015, for the first time, the UC Irvine Anteaters men's basketball team appeared in the Division I tournament. It was narrowly defeated in a first-round tournament game by Louisville. The Anteaters made their second NCAA appearance in 2019, beating fourth-seed Kansas State University for their first March Madness win ever.

== People ==
UC Irvine has more than 265,000 living alumni. These include astronauts (Tracy Caldwell Dyson), athletes (Steve Scott, Scott Brooks, Greg Louganis and 53 Olympians), Broadway, film, and television actors (Bob Gunton, James LeGros, Jon Lovitz, Brian Thompson, Teal Wicks, Windell Middlebrooks), technological innovators (Roy Fielding, Paul Mockapetris, and Patrick J. Hanratty), educators (Erin Gruwell), musicians (Kevin Kwan Loucks), and scientists (Mika Tosca).

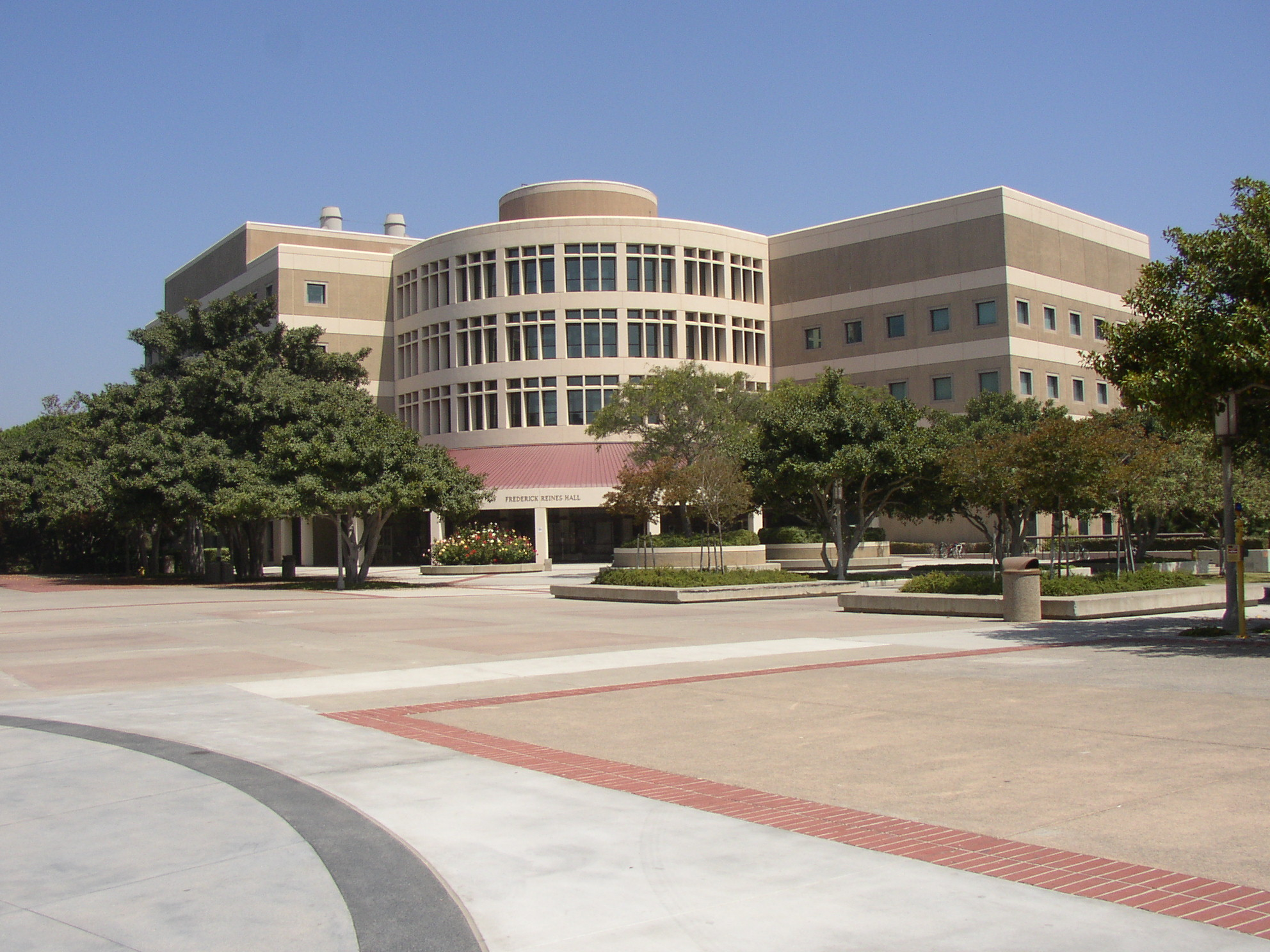
Frederick Reines Hall in the School of Physical Sciences, named after one of the UCI faculty members to receive the Nobel Prize.

Five people affiliated with UCI have been honored with the Nobel Prize: three faculty members, one postdoctoral scholar, and one alumnus. In 1995, professor Frank Sherwood Rowland along with postdoctoral student Mario Molina won the Nobel Prize in Chemistry while Frederick Reines won the Nobel Prize in Physics. In 1974, Rowland and Molina worked together to discover the harmful effects of CFCs on the ozone layer, while Reines received the Nobel Prize for his work in discovering the neutrino. In 2004, Irwin Rose, a professor at the School of Medicine, was co-awarded the Nobel Prize in Chemistry along with two professors from the Technion for the discovery of ubiquitin-mediated protein degradation. Additionally, David MacMillan, who completed his PhD. from UCI in 1996 was awarded the Nobel Prize in Chemistry in 2021 for the development of asymmetric organocatalysis.

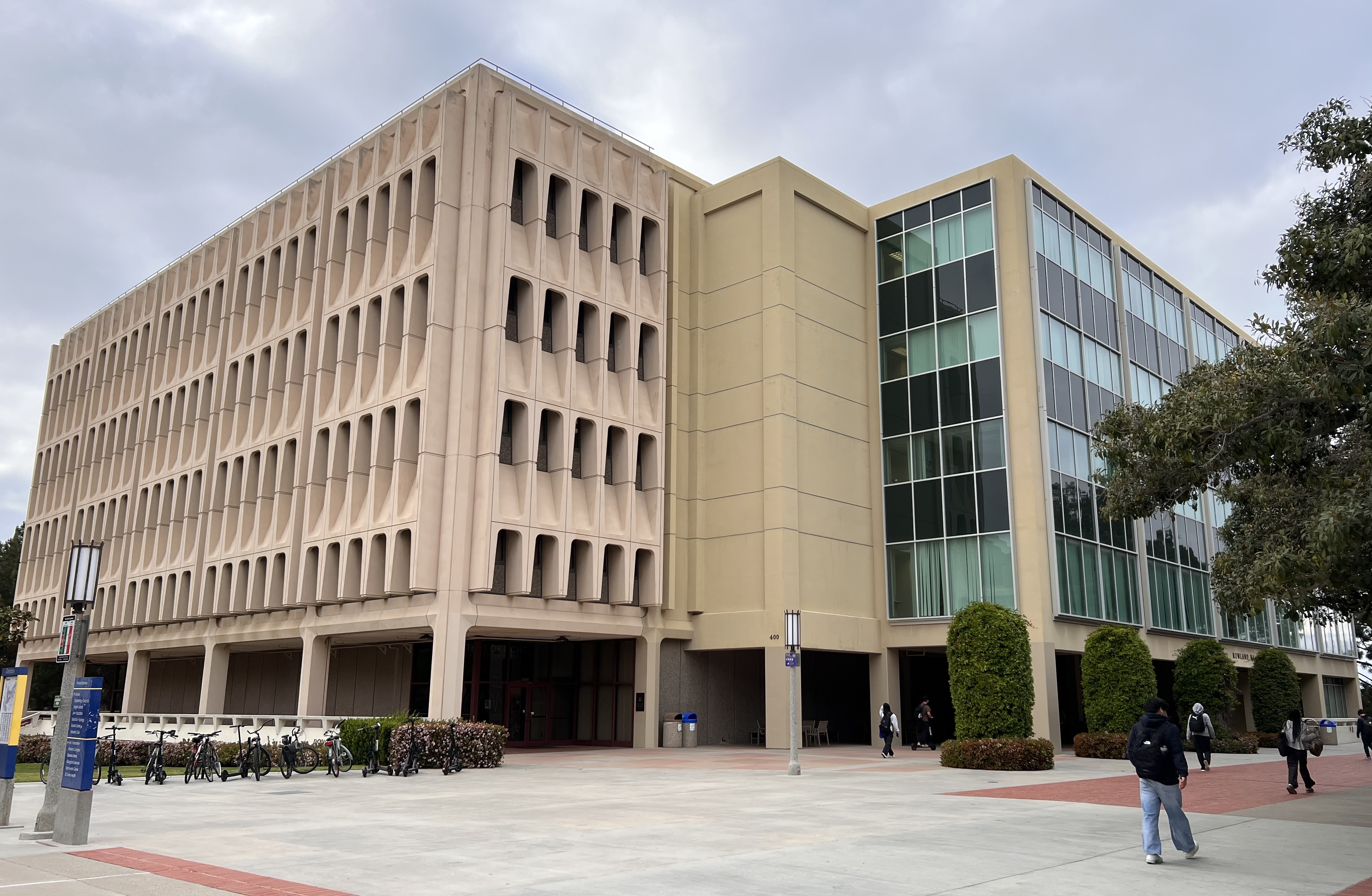
Rowland Hall, named after Frank "Sherry" Rowland, who won a Nobel Prize in Chemistry for the discovery that CFCs contribute to ozone depletion. It is a National Historic Chemical Landmark.

Seven Pulitzer Prize winners have been associated with UCI, including three faculty members and four alumni. These include Michael Chabon, who won the Pulitzer Prize for Fiction in 2001 for The Amazing Adventures of Kavalier & Clay, and Richard Ford, who won the Pulitzer Prize for Fiction in 1996 for Independence Day. Claude Yarbrough (aka Jonathan Pendragon), class of '76, is one of the most influential magicians of the 20th and 21st centuries. Thomas Keneally was a visiting professor at UCI in 1985 (when he taught the graduate fiction workshop) and again from 1991 to 1995 (when he was a visiting professor in the writing program). Keneally is most famous for his book Schindler's Ark (1982) (later republished as Schindler's List), which won the Booker Prize and is the basis of the film Schindler's List that was directed by Steven Spielberg.

The Comparative Literature and Philosophy departments at Irvine have accommodated distinguished intellectuals of international acclaim, including Jacques Derrida, a philosopher and critic most commonly associated with postmodern and post-structuralist thought, who held a position at the University of California, Irvine Department of Comparative Literature from 1986 to his death in 2004; his colleague, Jean-François Lyotard, who taught at UCI from 1987 until 1994; Fellow at the American Academy of Arts and Sciences, British philosopher Margaret Gilbert best known for her founding contributions to the analytic philosophy of social phenomena; and British philosopher and FRSE Duncan Pritchard.

In addition to the Department of Philosophy at UCI, its sister department, the Department of Logic and Philosophy of Science, which together are ranked as one of the top philosophy programs in the world, also accommodates philosophers such as Brian Skyrms, known for his contributions on game theory and social norms; Jeffrey A. Barrett, known for his contributions to philosophy of physics; and Kai Wehmeier, known for his contributions to Frege.

Ralph J. Cicerone, an earth system science professor and former chancellor of UCI, served as president of the National Academy of Sciences from 2005 to 2016.

Three UCI faculty members have been named National Medal of Science recipients. In January 2009, UCI Professor Reg Penner won the Faraday Medal for his research with nanowires.

== See also ==
- Anteater Recreation Center
- Center for Chemistry at the Space-Time Limit
