= UCI Arboretum =

Botanical garden in Irvine, California

Coordinates: 33.6635°N 117.853°W

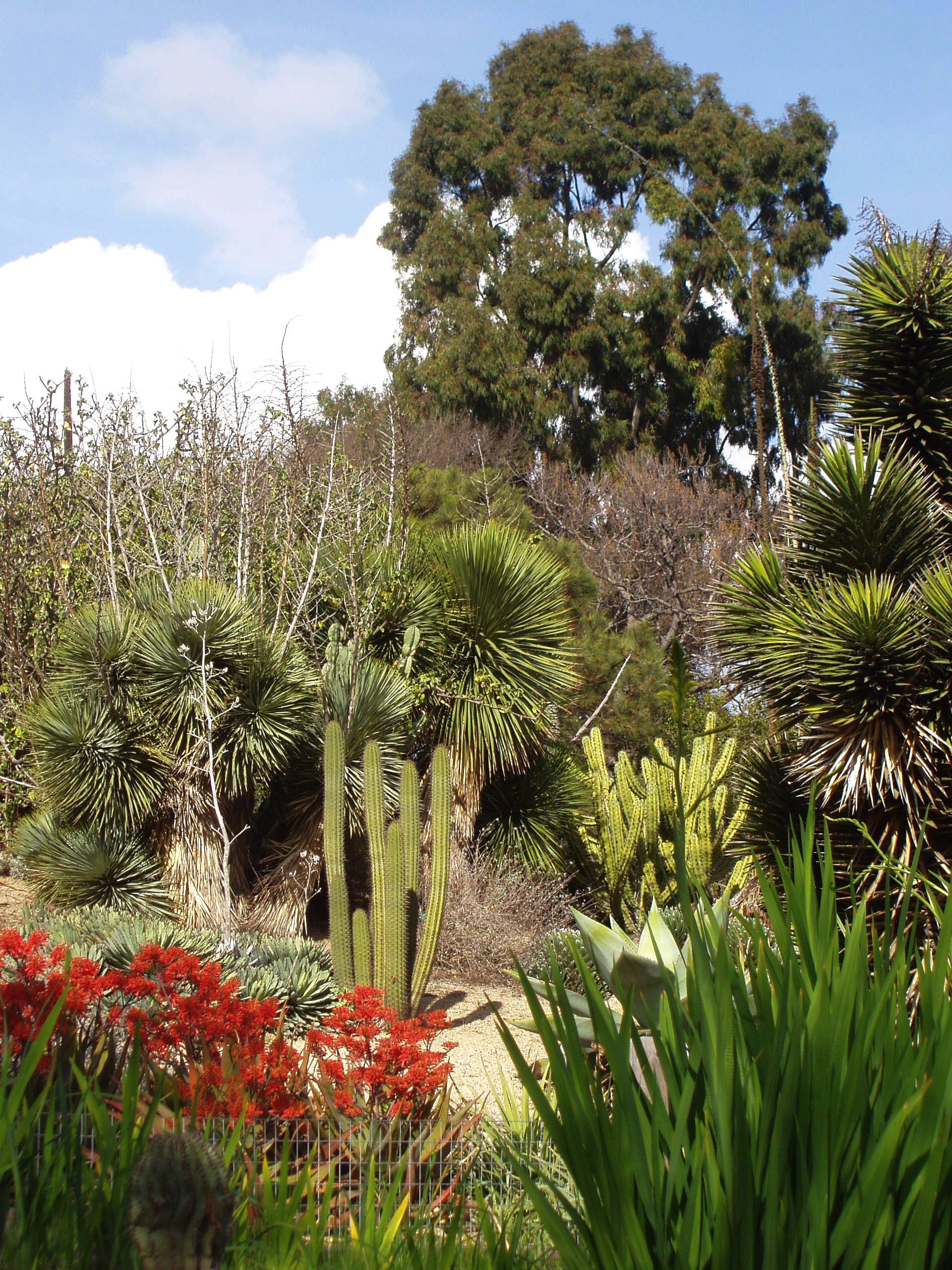
General view of the University of California, Irvine, Arboretum.

The University of California, Irvine Arboretum (UCI Arboretum or UC Irvine Arboretum) is 12.5 acres (5.1 ha) botanical garden and arboretum, part of the University of California, Irvine in Irvine, California. It is located north of the main UCI campus, on Campus Drive in Irvine, near the San Joaquin Wildlife Sanctuary and the Upper Newport Bay. The Arboretum carries out conservation activities and supports student and faculty research.

== Background ==
The two major emphases of the collection are the plants of the California Floristic Province (where UC Irvine is located) and plants of South Africa. Notable among the arboretum's collection of California native plants are species from Baja California, the Channel Islands of California, the Mojave Desert, Southern maritime chaparral, Otay Mesa, and California oak woodland. California native grasslands, wildflowers, and maritime succulent scrub are in the collection. There is also an aloe collection.

The Arboretum was formerly open to the public, but is now only open during quarterly open houses.

== See also ==
- List of botanical gardens in the United States
