= Ann Forsyth =

Ann Forsyth is the Ruth and Frank Stanton Professor of Urban Planning at the Harvard Graduate School of Design.

In 2018, Forsyth won the Margarita McCoy Award for the Advancement of Women in Planning. The award, by the Association of Collegiate Schools of Planning (ACSP) Faculty Women's Interest Group, recognizes "individuals who have made an outstanding contribution toward the advancement of women in planning at institutions of higher education through service, teaching, and/or research."

== Books ==
- Designing Small Parks: A Manual for Addressing Social and Ecological Concerns (Wiley, 2005)
- Reforming Suburbia: The Planned Communities of Irvine, Columbia, and The Woodlands (University of California Press, 2005)
- Creating Healthy Neighborhoods: Evidence‑Based Planning and Design Strategies (Routledge / American Planning Association, 2017)
- Constructing Suburbs: Competing Voices in a Debate over Urban Growth (Routledge, 1999)
- New Towns for the Twenty‑First Century: A Guide to Planned Communities Worldwide (co‑editor) (Lincoln Institute of Land Policy, 2021)
