= Newport Coast, Newport Beach =

Newport Coast
- Community of Newport Beach
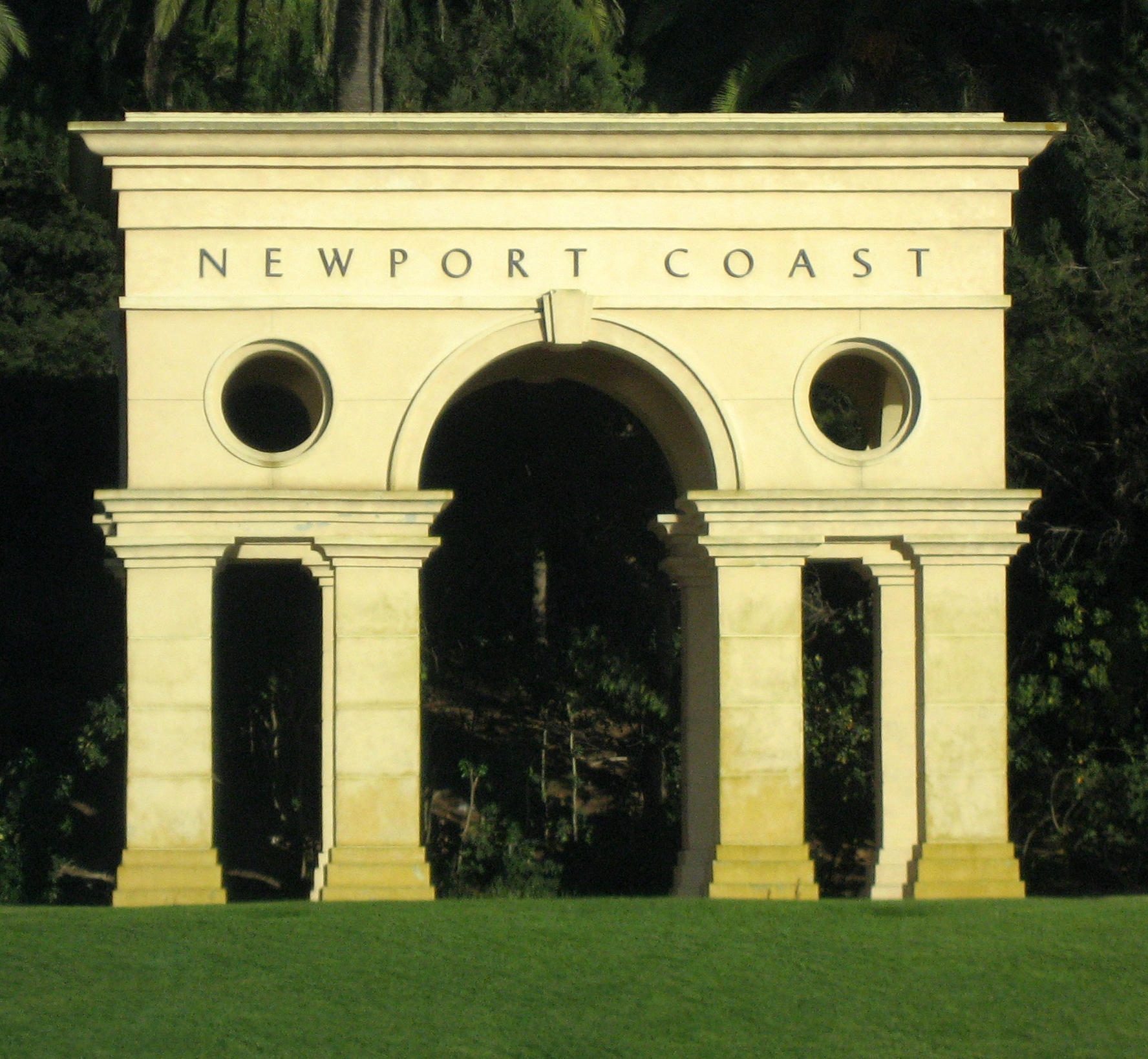
- Newport Coast arch along the Pacific Coast Highway

- The southeast portion of the red area (City of Newport Beach) is the location of Newport Coast in Orange County
- Country: United States
- State: California
- County: Orange
- City: Newport Beach

Population (2010)
  - Total: 9,741
- Time zone: UTC-8 (PST)
  - Summer (DST): UTC-7 (PDT)

Newport Coast is a community south of the main body of the city of Newport Beach, California. It was a separate census-designated place in Orange County, California, United States, until 2001, when it was annexed into Newport Beach. Newport Beach, California's estimated population is 86,160 according to the most recent United States census estimates. Newport Beach, California is the 96th largest city in California based on official 2017 estimates from the US Census Bureau.

The master-planned community was developed by the Irvine Company. There are a variety of home types in the community, from small studio apartments to ocean view mansions.

== Geography ==
Newport Coast is located at 33°35′51″N 117°50′06″W, in the San Joaquin Hills above Crystal Cove State Park.

According to the United States Census Bureau, the Census Designated Place (CDP) has a total area of 7.2 square miles (19 km^{2}). 7.1 square miles (18 km^{2}) of it is land and 0.2 square miles (0.52 km^{2}) of it (2.22%) is water.

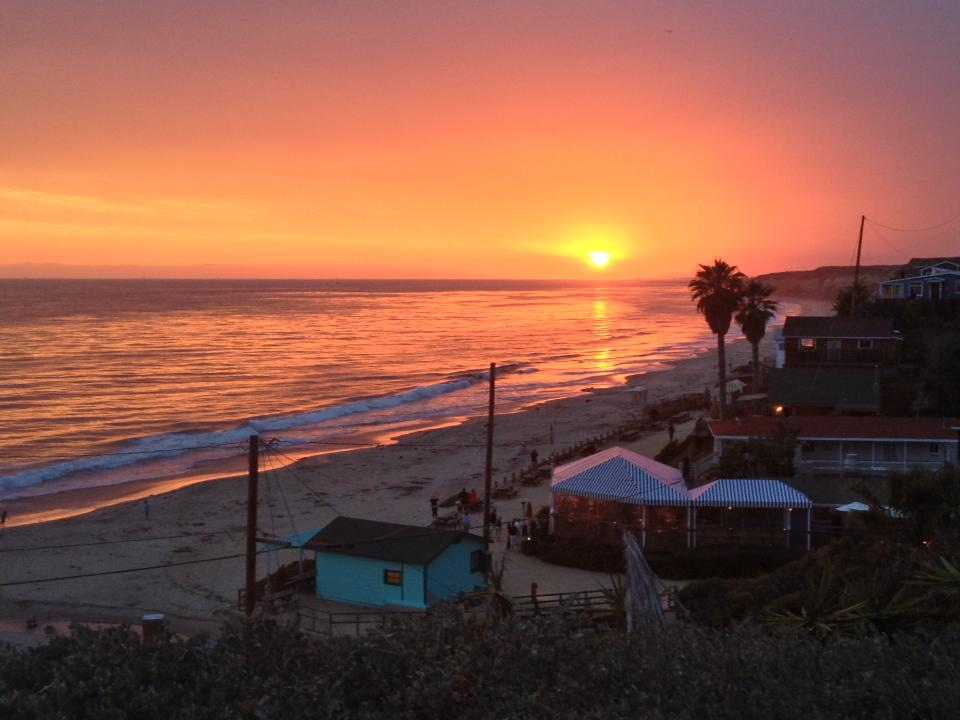
View From Ruby's Shake Shack on PCH

== Demographics ==
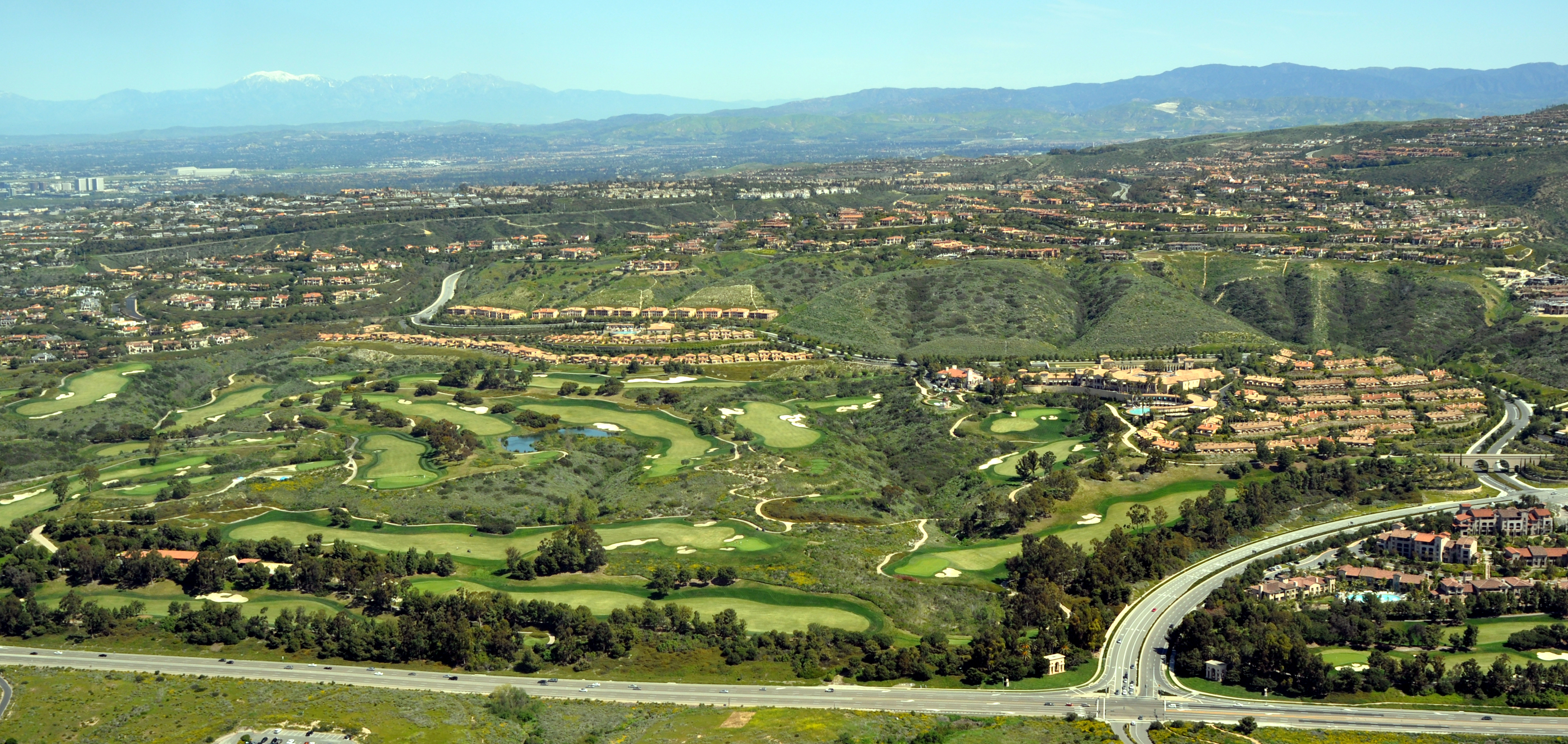
Newport Coast Aerial photo of Pelican Hill and the arch along the Pacific Coast Highway

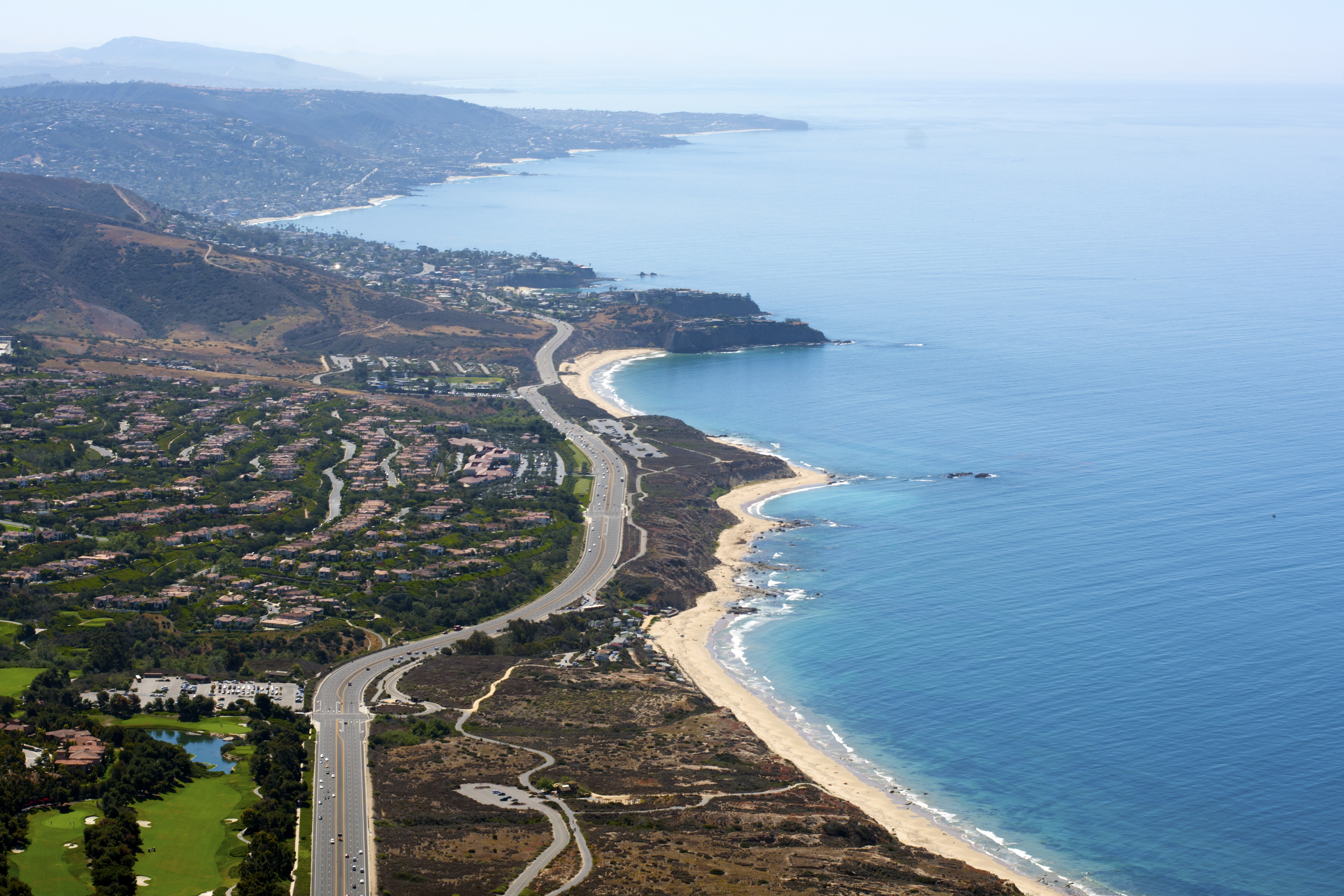
Newport Coast

As of the census of 2000, there were 2,671 people, 1,001 households, and 776 families residing in the CDP. The population density was 378.9 inhabitants per square mile (146.3/km^{2}). There were 1,106 housing units at an average density of 156.9 per square mile (60.6/km^{2}). The racial makeup of the CDP was 78.06% White, 0.26% African American, 0.15% Native American, 18.08% Asian, 0.30% from other races, and 3.14% from two or more races. Hispanic or Latino of any race were 4.19% of the population.

There were 1,001 households, out of which 35.7% had children under the age of 18 living with them, 72.3% were married couples living together, 3.2% had a female householder with no husband present, and 22.4% were non-families. 16.4% of all households were made up of individuals, and 3.0% had someone living alone who was 65 years of age or older. The average household size was 2.67 and the average family size was 3.02.

In the CDP, the population was spread out, with 24.6% under the age of 18, 3.8% from 18 to 24, 31.6% from 25 to 44, 33.0% from 45 to 64, and 7.0% who were 65 years of age or older. The median age was 40 years. For every 100 females, there were 97.7 males. For every 100 females age 18 and over, there were 96.1 males.

The median income for a household in the CDP was $164,659, and the median income for a family was $173,043. Males had a median income of $100,000+ versus $70,069 for females. The per capita income for the CDP was $98,770. About 1.3% of families and 2.8% of the population were below the poverty line, including 2.1% of those under age 18 and 4.8% of those age 65 or over.

== Government ==
In the California State Legislature, Newport Coast is in the 37th senatorial district, represented by Republican Steven Choi, and in the 74th Assembly district, represented by Republican Laurie Davies.

In the United States House of Representatives, Newport Coast is in California's 48th congressional district, represented by Republican Darrell Issa.
